This is a partial list of unnumbered minor planets for principal provisional designations assigned between 1 January and 15 March 2000. , a total of 550 bodies remain unnumbered for this period. Objects for this year are listed on the following pages: A–E · F–O · P–R · S–T and U–Y. Also see previous and next year.

A 

|- id="2000 AA6" bgcolor=#FFC2E0
| 1 ||  || APO || 22.1 || data-sort-value="0.316" | 316 m || multiple || 2000–2018 || 19 Dec 2018 || 152 || align=left | Disc.: LINEAR || 
|- id="2000 AB6" bgcolor=#FFC2E0
| 1 ||  || APO || 22.2 || data-sort-value="0.13" | 130 m || multiple || 2000–2011 || 02 Oct 2011 || 141 || align=left | Disc.: LINEAR || 
|- id="2000 AG6" bgcolor=#FFC2E0
| 6 ||  || APO || 25.3 || data-sort-value="0.031" | 31 m || single || 7 days || 10 Jan 2000 || 68 || align=left | Disc.: LINEAR || 
|- id="2000 AU49" bgcolor=#FA8072
| 0 ||  = (619196) || MCA || 17.8 || 1.5 km || multiple || 2000–2019 || 29 May 2019 || 166 || align=left | Disc.: LINEAR || 
|- id="2000 AZ54" bgcolor=#E9E9E9
| 0 ||  || MBA-M || 18.72 || 1.0 km || multiple || 2000–2021 || 08 Nov 2021 || 50 || align=left | Disc.: SpacewatchAlt.: 2008 YJ106 || 
|- id="2000 AL84" bgcolor=#E9E9E9
| 0 ||  || MBA-M || 17.14 || 1.1 km || multiple || 2000–2021 || 03 Aug 2021 || 164 || align=left | Disc.: LINEARAlt.: 2014 QP478 || 
|- id="2000 AY93" bgcolor=#FA8072
| 1 ||  || MCA || 17.7 || 1.6 km || multiple || 1999–2017 || 23 Apr 2017 || 297 || align=left | Disc.: LINEAR || 
|- id="2000 AY105" bgcolor=#FA8072
| 0 ||  || MCA || 18.51 || 1.1 km || multiple || 2000–2021 || 08 Sep 2021 || 68 || align=left | Disc.: LINEAR || 
|- id="2000 AA148" bgcolor=#E9E9E9
| 0 ||  || MBA-M || 16.87 || 1.3 km || multiple || 2000–2021 || 11 May 2021 || 150 || align=left | Disc.: LINEARAlt.: 2013 HC81 || 
|- id="2000 AE205" bgcolor=#FFC2E0
| 1 ||  || APO || 23.0 || data-sort-value="0.089" | 89 m || multiple || 2000–2019 || 23 Jun 2019 || 83 || align=left | Disc.: LINEARAMO at MPC || 
|- id="2000 AG205" bgcolor=#FFC2E0
| 1 ||  || AMO || 19.7 || data-sort-value="0.955" | 955 m || multiple || 2000–2014 || 14 May 2014 || 87 || align=left | Disc.: Spacewatch || 
|- id="2000 AH205" bgcolor=#FFC2E0
| 2 ||  || APO || 22.6 || data-sort-value="0.11" | 110 m || multiple || 2000–2020 || 13 Jun 2020 || 91 || align=left | Disc.: LINEARAlt.: 2015 HS9 || 
|- id="2000 AB207" bgcolor=#E9E9E9
| 0 ||  || MBA-M || 17.7 || 1.2 km || multiple || 2000–2020 || 23 Dec 2020 || 41 || align=left | Disc.: SpacewatchAlt.: 2017 BX126 || 
|- id="2000 AS207" bgcolor=#fefefe
| 0 ||  || MBA-I || 17.7 || data-sort-value="0.86" | 860 m || multiple || 2000–2020 || 17 Oct 2020 || 131 || align=left | Disc.: SpacewatchAdded on 30 September 2021Alt.: 2004 HU82 || 
|- id="2000 AP209" bgcolor=#d6d6d6
| 0 ||  || MBA-O || 16.44 || 3.7 km || multiple || 1999–2022 || 06 Jan 2022 || 242 || align=left | Disc.: SpacewatchAlt.: 2010 QY1 || 
|- id="2000 AL210" bgcolor=#C2FFFF
| 0 ||  || JT || 14.01 || 8.8 km || multiple || 2000–2021 || 29 Sep 2021 || 49 || align=left | Disc.: SpacewatchGreek camp (L4) || 
|- id="2000 AR211" bgcolor=#FA8072
| 3 ||  || MCA || 18.5 || data-sort-value="0.59" | 590 m || multiple || 2000–2020 || 10 Sep 2020 || 22 || align=left | Disc.: SpacewatchAdded on 11 May 2021Alt.: 2020 OB83 || 
|- id="2000 AW212" bgcolor=#d6d6d6
| 0 ||  || MBA-O || 16.2 || 3.2 km || multiple || 2000–2020 || 17 Dec 2020 || 130 || align=left | Disc.: SpacewatchAlt.: 2014 SX335 || 
|- id="2000 AO217" bgcolor=#d6d6d6
| 0 ||  || MBA-O || 16.32 || 3.0 km || multiple || 2000–2021 || 01 Nov 2021 || 78 || align=left | Disc.: Spacewatch || 
|- id="2000 AO218" bgcolor=#fefefe
| 1 ||  || HUN || 18.8 || data-sort-value="0.52" | 520 m || multiple || 2000–2022 || 26 Jan 2022 || 33 || align=left | Disc.: SpacewatchAdded on 29 January 2022 || 
|- id="2000 AR219" bgcolor=#E9E9E9
| 0 ||  || MBA-M || 18.25 || data-sort-value="0.67" | 670 m || multiple || 2000–2021 || 07 Apr 2021 || 40 || align=left | Disc.: Spacewatch || 
|- id="2000 AZ219" bgcolor=#d6d6d6
| 3 ||  || MBA-O || 16.4 || 2.9 km || multiple || 2000–2021 || 11 Oct 2021 || 20 || align=left | Disc.: SpacewatchAdded on 29 January 2022 || 
|- id="2000 AA220" bgcolor=#E9E9E9
| 0 ||  || MBA-M || 17.5 || 1.3 km || multiple || 1999–2020 || 05 Nov 2020 || 94 || align=left | Disc.: Spacewatch || 
|- id="2000 AN220" bgcolor=#d6d6d6
| 0 ||  || MBA-O || 16.24 || 3.1 km || multiple || 2000–2022 || 27 Jan 2022 || 132 || align=left | Disc.: SpacewatchAlt.: 2010 CS244 || 
|- id="2000 AZ220" bgcolor=#E9E9E9
| 0 ||  || MBA-M || 16.6 || 2.0 km || multiple || 2000–2021 || 16 Jan 2021 || 78 || align=left | Disc.: Spacewatch || 
|- id="2000 AO221" bgcolor=#E9E9E9
| 0 ||  || MBA-M || 17.48 || data-sort-value="0.95" | 950 m || multiple || 2000–2021 || 09 May 2021 || 169 || align=left | Disc.: Spacewatch || 
|- id="2000 AR221" bgcolor=#fefefe
| 0 ||  || MBA-I || 18.1 || data-sort-value="0.71" | 710 m || multiple || 2000–2020 || 19 Nov 2020 || 88 || align=left | Disc.: Spacewatch || 
|- id="2000 AK223" bgcolor=#E9E9E9
| 0 ||  = (619197) || MBA-M || 16.8 || 2.4 km || multiple || 2000–2020 || 29 Apr 2020 || 55 || align=left | Disc.: SpacewatchAlt.: 2013 XT8, 2016 LL33 || 
|- id="2000 AL223" bgcolor=#fefefe
| 0 ||  || MBA-I || 18.1 || data-sort-value="0.71" | 710 m || multiple || 2000–2021 || 11 Jun 2021 || 138 || align=left | Disc.: SpacewatchAlt.: 2014 EH37 || 
|- id="2000 AQ223" bgcolor=#E9E9E9
| 0 ||  || MBA-M || 17.6 || data-sort-value="0.90" | 900 m || multiple || 2000–2020 || 22 Nov 2020 || 37 || align=left | Disc.: SpacewatchAlt.: 2015 OY57 || 
|- id="2000 AT224" bgcolor=#E9E9E9
| 0 ||  || MBA-M || 17.59 || data-sort-value="0.90" | 900 m || multiple || 2000–2021 || 29 Apr 2021 || 115 || align=left | Disc.: SpacewatchAlt.: 2014 OW179 || 
|- id="2000 AO226" bgcolor=#E9E9E9
| 0 ||  || MBA-M || 17.5 || 1.3 km || multiple || 2000–2021 || 07 Jan 2021 || 107 || align=left | Disc.: SpacewatchAlt.: 2011 QQ5 || 
|- id="2000 AV226" bgcolor=#fefefe
| 0 ||  || MBA-I || 18.01 || data-sort-value="0.74" | 740 m || multiple || 2000–2021 || 12 May 2021 || 101 || align=left | Disc.: Spacewatch || 
|- id="2000 AU227" bgcolor=#fefefe
| 0 ||  || HUN || 18.52 || data-sort-value="0.59" | 590 m || multiple || 2000–2021 || 07 Apr 2021 || 57 || align=left | Disc.: SpacewatchAdded on 11 May 2021Alt.: 2019 MV18 || 
|- id="2000 AV227" bgcolor=#fefefe
| 1 ||  || HUN || 19.12 || data-sort-value="0.45" | 450 m || multiple || 2000–2022 || 10 Jan 2022 || 28 || align=left | Disc.: SpacewatchAdded on 29 January 2022 || 
|- id="2000 AA228" bgcolor=#E9E9E9
| 0 ||  || MBA-M || 17.0 || 2.2 km || multiple || 2000–2021 || 26 Nov 2021 || 38 || align=left | Disc.: SpacewatchAdded on 24 December 2021 || 
|- id="2000 AB228" bgcolor=#fefefe
| 0 ||  || MBA-I || 18.2 || data-sort-value="0.68" | 680 m || multiple || 2000–2021 || 11 Jan 2021 || 89 || align=left | Disc.: SpacewatchAdded on 17 January 2021 || 
|- id="2000 AB229" bgcolor=#C2E0FF
| 2 ||  || TNO || 14.0 || 10 km || single || 64 days || 09 Mar 2000 || 194 || align=left | Disc.: LINEARLoUTNOs, damocloid || 
|- id="2000 AC229" bgcolor=#d6d6d6
| 0 ||  || MBA-O || 16.8 || 2.4 km || multiple || 2000–2017 || 01 Apr 2017 || 209 || align=left | Disc.: LINEAR || 
|- id="2000 AC236" bgcolor=#d6d6d6
| 0 ||  || MBA-O || 17.0 || 2.2 km || multiple || 2000–2021 || 01 Feb 2021 || 110 || align=left | Disc.: SpacewatchAlt.: 2016 CT18 || 
|- id="2000 AN247" bgcolor=#fefefe
| 0 ||  || MBA-I || 18.4 || data-sort-value="0.62" | 620 m || multiple || 1997–2020 || 11 Oct 2020 || 105 || align=left | Disc.: SpacewatchAlt.: 2016 FX53 || 
|- id="2000 AT251" bgcolor=#d6d6d6
| 0 ||  || MBA-O || 17.2 || 2.0 km || multiple || 2000–2018 || 08 Aug 2018 || 33 || align=left | Disc.: Spacewatch || 
|- id="2000 AM253" bgcolor=#fefefe
| 0 ||  || MBA-I || 17.8 || data-sort-value="0.82" | 820 m || multiple || 2000–2021 || 05 Jan 2021 || 231 || align=left | Disc.: SpacewatchAlt.: 2002 RU296 || 
|- id="2000 AB255" bgcolor=#C2E0FF
| E ||  || TNO || 8.9 || 69 km || single || 1 day || 02 Jan 2000 || 44 || align=left | Disc.: Mauna Kea Obs.LoUTNOs, other TNO || 
|- id="2000 AC255" bgcolor=#C2E0FF
| E ||  || TNO || 8.9 || 69 km || single || 1 day || 02 Jan 2000 || 6 || align=left | Disc.: Mauna Kea Obs.LoUTNOs, other TNO || 
|- id="2000 AD255" bgcolor=#C2E0FF
| E ||  || TNO || 8.9 || 69 km || single || 1 day || 02 Jan 2000 || 18 || align=left | Disc.: Mauna Kea Obs.LoUTNOs, other TNO || 
|- id="2000 AE255" bgcolor=#C2E0FF
| E ||  || TNO || 8.3 || 91 km || single || 1 day || 07 Jan 2000 || 33 || align=left | Disc.: Mauna Kea Obs.LoUTNOs, other TNO || 
|- id="2000 AF255" bgcolor=#C2E0FF
| 1 ||  || TNO || 5.9 || 275 km || multiple || 2000–2020 || 01 Feb 2020 || 58 || align=left | Disc.: Mauna Kea Obs.LoUTNOs, other TNO, BR-mag: 1.78 || 
|- id="2000 AK256" bgcolor=#fefefe
| 0 ||  || MBA-I || 18.0 || data-sort-value="0.75" | 750 m || multiple || 1993–2020 || 14 Sep 2020 || 81 || align=left | Disc.: SpacewatchAdded on 19 October 2020 || 
|- id="2000 AL258" bgcolor=#E9E9E9
| 0 ||  || MBA-M || 17.02 || 2.2 km || multiple || 2000–2021 || 13 Sep 2021 || 165 || align=left | Disc.: Spacewatch || 
|- id="2000 AM258" bgcolor=#fefefe
| 0 ||  || MBA-I || 18.67 || data-sort-value="0.55" | 550 m || multiple || 2000–2021 || 09 Nov 2021 || 139 || align=left | Disc.: Spacewatch || 
|- id="2000 AO258" bgcolor=#d6d6d6
| 0 ||  || MBA-O || 16.63 || 2.6 km || multiple || 2000–2021 || 03 May 2021 || 89 || align=left | Disc.: Spacewatch || 
|- id="2000 AP258" bgcolor=#d6d6d6
| 0 ||  || MBA-O || 16.7 || 2.5 km || multiple || 1999–2020 || 15 Dec 2020 || 91 || align=left | Disc.: Spacewatch || 
|- id="2000 AR258" bgcolor=#E9E9E9
| 0 ||  || MBA-M || 16.6 || 2.7 km || multiple || 2000–2021 || 07 Jun 2021 || 83 || align=left | Disc.: Spacewatch || 
|- id="2000 AS258" bgcolor=#fefefe
| 0 ||  || MBA-I || 18.1 || data-sort-value="0.71" | 710 m || multiple || 2000–2021 || 06 Jan 2021 || 131 || align=left | Disc.: Spacewatch || 
|- id="2000 AU258" bgcolor=#E9E9E9
| 0 ||  || MBA-M || 17.8 || data-sort-value="0.82" | 820 m || multiple || 2000–2021 || 18 Jan 2021 || 65 || align=left | Disc.: Spacewatch || 
|- id="2000 AV258" bgcolor=#d6d6d6
| 0 ||  || MBA-O || 16.7 || 2.5 km || multiple || 2000–2021 || 13 Jan 2021 || 75 || align=left | Disc.: Spacewatch || 
|- id="2000 AX258" bgcolor=#E9E9E9
| 0 ||  || MBA-M || 16.82 || 1.3 km || multiple || 2000–2021 || 03 Apr 2021 || 60 || align=left | Disc.: Spacewatch || 
|- id="2000 AY258" bgcolor=#E9E9E9
| 0 ||  || MBA-M || 17.54 || data-sort-value="0.92" | 920 m || multiple || 2000–2021 || 15 Apr 2021 || 112 || align=left | Disc.: Spacewatch || 
|- id="2000 AZ258" bgcolor=#fefefe
| 0 ||  || MBA-I || 18.0 || data-sort-value="0.75" | 750 m || multiple || 2000–2020 || 24 Mar 2020 || 93 || align=left | Disc.: Spacewatch || 
|- id="2000 AA259" bgcolor=#E9E9E9
| 0 ||  || MBA-M || 17.4 || data-sort-value="0.98" | 980 m || multiple || 2000–2021 || 18 Jan 2021 || 63 || align=left | Disc.: Spacewatch || 
|- id="2000 AB259" bgcolor=#E9E9E9
| 0 ||  || MBA-M || 17.69 || 1.2 km || multiple || 2000–2022 || 27 Jan 2022 || 58 || align=left | Disc.: Spacewatch || 
|- id="2000 AC259" bgcolor=#E9E9E9
| 0 ||  || MBA-M || 17.4 || 1.4 km || multiple || 2000–2021 || 18 Jan 2021 || 64 || align=left | Disc.: Spacewatch || 
|- id="2000 AD259" bgcolor=#E9E9E9
| 0 ||  || MBA-M || 17.99 || 1.1 km || multiple || 2000–2022 || 23 Jan 2022 || 188 || align=left | Disc.: Spacewatch || 
|- id="2000 AF259" bgcolor=#d6d6d6
| 0 ||  || MBA-O || 17.4 || 1.8 km || multiple || 2000–2020 || 15 Dec 2020 || 54 || align=left | Disc.: Spacewatch || 
|- id="2000 AG259" bgcolor=#E9E9E9
| 2 ||  || MBA-M || 18.4 || data-sort-value="0.62" | 620 m || multiple || 2000–2019 || 28 Nov 2019 || 57 || align=left | Disc.: Spacewatch || 
|- id="2000 AH259" bgcolor=#E9E9E9
| 0 ||  || MBA-M || 18.11 || data-sort-value="0.71" | 710 m || multiple || 2000–2021 || 11 May 2021 || 70 || align=left | Disc.: Spacewatch || 
|- id="2000 AJ259" bgcolor=#E9E9E9
| 0 ||  || MBA-M || 17.36 || 1.0 km || multiple || 1998–2021 || 11 Apr 2021 || 77 || align=left | Disc.: Spacewatch || 
|- id="2000 AK259" bgcolor=#fefefe
| 0 ||  || MBA-I || 18.41 || data-sort-value="0.62" | 620 m || multiple || 2000–2021 || 31 Aug 2021 || 45 || align=left | Disc.: Spacewatch || 
|- id="2000 AL259" bgcolor=#d6d6d6
| 0 ||  || MBA-O || 16.8 || 2.4 km || multiple || 2000–2020 || 24 Jan 2020 || 46 || align=left | Disc.: Spacewatch || 
|- id="2000 AN259" bgcolor=#fefefe
| 0 ||  || MBA-I || 18.22 || data-sort-value="0.67" | 670 m || multiple || 2000–2022 || 27 Jan 2022 || 43 || align=left | Disc.: Spacewatch || 
|- id="2000 AQ259" bgcolor=#E9E9E9
| 0 ||  || MBA-M || 17.1 || 1.6 km || multiple || 2000–2021 || 08 Jan 2021 || 70 || align=left | Disc.: Spacewatch || 
|- id="2000 AR259" bgcolor=#C2FFFF
| 0 ||  || JT || 14.47 || 7.1 km || multiple || 2000–2021 || 05 Dec 2021 || 97 || align=left | Disc.: SpacewatchGreek camp (L4) || 
|- id="2000 AS259" bgcolor=#E9E9E9
| 0 ||  = (619198) || MBA-M || 17.5 || 1.8 km || multiple || 2000–2020 || 28 Apr 2020 || 58 || align=left | Disc.: Spacewatch || 
|- id="2000 AT259" bgcolor=#fefefe
| 0 ||  || MBA-I || 17.8 || data-sort-value="0.82" | 820 m || multiple || 2000–2021 || 18 Jan 2021 || 45 || align=left | Disc.: Spacewatch || 
|- id="2000 AW259" bgcolor=#E9E9E9
| 0 ||  || MBA-M || 18.0 || 1.4 km || multiple || 2000–2019 || 28 May 2019 || 33 || align=left | Disc.: Spacewatch || 
|- id="2000 AX259" bgcolor=#d6d6d6
| 0 ||  || MBA-O || 16.7 || 2.5 km || multiple || 2000–2020 || 18 Oct 2020 || 44 || align=left | Disc.: Spacewatch || 
|- id="2000 AY259" bgcolor=#E9E9E9
| 0 ||  || MBA-M || 17.1 || 1.6 km || multiple || 2000–2021 || 10 Jan 2021 || 126 || align=left | Disc.: Spacewatch || 
|- id="2000 AZ259" bgcolor=#C2FFFF
| 0 ||  || JT || 14.58 || 6.8 km || multiple || 2000–2021 || 29 Nov 2021 || 95 || align=left | Disc.: SpacewatchGreek camp (L4) || 
|- id="2000 AA260" bgcolor=#fefefe
| 0 ||  || MBA-I || 18.8 || data-sort-value="0.52" | 520 m || multiple || 2000–2019 || 29 Oct 2019 || 44 || align=left | Disc.: Spacewatch || 
|}
back to top

B 

|- id="2000 BD9" bgcolor=#d6d6d6
| 0 ||  || MBA-O || 16.84 || 2.4 km || multiple || 2000–2021 || 14 Jul 2021 || 90 || align=left | Disc.: SpacewatchAlt.: 2015 DK42 || 
|- id="2000 BL10" bgcolor=#E9E9E9
| 0 ||  || MBA-M || 18.21 || data-sort-value="0.68" | 680 m || multiple || 2000–2021 || 07 Apr 2021 || 27 || align=left | Disc.: SpacewatchAdded on 22 July 2020 || 
|- id="2000 BH19" bgcolor=#FFC2E0
| 0 ||  || AMO || 19.81 || data-sort-value="0.43" | 400 m || multiple || 1996–2022 || 26 Nov 2022 || 270 || align=left | Disc.: LINEAR || 
|- id="2000 BK19" bgcolor=#FFC2E0
| 0 ||  || APO || 22.1 || data-sort-value="0.14" | 140 m || multiple || 2000–2015 || 18 Feb 2015 || 122 || align=left | Disc.: LINEARAlt.: 2015 BU310 || 
|- id="2000 BO19" bgcolor=#FFC2E0
| 8 ||  || APO || 24.6 || data-sort-value="0.043" | 43 m || single || 4 days || 03 Feb 2000 || 9 || align=left | Disc.: Spacewatch || 
|- id="2000 BS21" bgcolor=#d6d6d6
| 0 ||  || MBA-O || 16.72 || 2.5 km || multiple || 2000–2021 || 08 Apr 2021 || 96 || align=left | Disc.: Spacewatch || 
|- id="2000 BT21" bgcolor=#d6d6d6
| 0 ||  || MBA-O || 16.2 || 3.2 km || multiple || 2000–2018 || 13 Aug 2018 || 60 || align=left | Disc.: Spacewatch || 
|- id="2000 BO28" bgcolor=#FFC2E0
| 1 ||  || APO || 19.7 || data-sort-value="0.41" | 410 m || multiple || 1989–2020 || 11 Mar 2020 || 135 || align=left | Disc.: SpacewatchPotentially hazardous object || 
|- id="2000 BF31" bgcolor=#fefefe
| 0 ||  || MBA-I || 18.5 || data-sort-value="0.59" | 590 m || multiple || 2000–2021 || 06 Jan 2021 || 103 || align=left | Disc.: SpacewatchAlt.: 2009 SR152 || 
|- id="2000 BR36" bgcolor=#fefefe
| 0 ||  || MBA-I || 18.3 || data-sort-value="0.65" | 650 m || multiple || 2000–2020 || 26 Feb 2020 || 93 || align=left | Disc.: SpacewatchAlt.: 2014 LF5, 2017 HV32 || 
|- id="2000 BU36" bgcolor=#fefefe
| 0 ||  || MBA-I || 18.5 || data-sort-value="0.59" | 590 m || multiple || 2000–2020 || 23 Sep 2020 || 51 || align=left | Disc.: Spacewatch || 
|- id="2000 BV36" bgcolor=#d6d6d6
| 0 ||  || MBA-O || 16.0 || 3.5 km || multiple || 2000–2021 || 18 Jan 2021 || 141 || align=left | Disc.: SpacewatchAlt.: 2018 PW || 
|- id="2000 BW36" bgcolor=#E9E9E9
| 0 ||  || MBA-M || 18.09 || data-sort-value="0.72" | 720 m || multiple || 2000–2021 || 08 May 2021 || 62 || align=left | Disc.: Spacewatch || 
|- id="2000 BZ36" bgcolor=#d6d6d6
| 0 ||  || MBA-O || 16.3 || 3.1 km || multiple || 2000–2021 || 17 Jan 2021 || 122 || align=left | Disc.: SpacewatchAlt.: 2010 EX162, 2014 WD482, 2016 CR157, 2018 MS3 || 
|- id="2000 BC37" bgcolor=#d6d6d6
| 0 ||  || MBA-O || 15.66 || 4.1 km || multiple || 2000–2022 || 06 Jan 2022 || 163 || align=left | Disc.: SpacewatchAlt.: 2015 RP17 || 
|- id="2000 BF37" bgcolor=#E9E9E9
| 0 ||  || MBA-M || 17.59 || 1.7 km || multiple || 2000–2021 || 23 Nov 2021 || 58 || align=left | Disc.: SpacewatchAlt.: 2008 YJ132 || 
|- id="2000 BJ38" bgcolor=#fefefe
| 1 ||  || MBA-I || 18.6 || data-sort-value="0.57" | 570 m || multiple || 2000–2014 || 26 Nov 2014 || 38 || align=left | Disc.: SpacewatchAlt.: 2000 CN148, 2008 FZ4 || 
|- id="2000 BG39" bgcolor=#d6d6d6
| 0 ||  || MBA-O || 17.33 || 1.9 km || multiple || 2000–2022 || 06 Jan 2022 || 80 || align=left | Disc.: Spacewatch || 
|- id="2000 BH41" bgcolor=#d6d6d6
| 0 ||  || MBA-O || 16.7 || 2.5 km || multiple || 2000–2021 || 18 Jan 2021 || 63 || align=left | Disc.: Spacewatch || 
|- id="2000 BL41" bgcolor=#E9E9E9
| 0 ||  || MBA-M || 18.0 || 1.1 km || multiple || 2000–2020 || 14 Nov 2020 || 76 || align=left | Disc.: SpacewatchAlt.: 2013 CF137 || 
|- id="2000 BC42" bgcolor=#d6d6d6
| 0 ||  || MBA-O || 16.84 || 2.6 km || multiple || 2000–2021 || 08 Sep 2021 || 86 || align=left | Disc.: SpacewatchAlt.: 2010 LU28 || 
|- id="2000 BD42" bgcolor=#d6d6d6
| 0 ||  || MBA-O || 16.42 || 2.9 km || multiple || 2000–2022 || 06 Jan 2022 || 117 || align=left | Disc.: SpacewatchAlt.: 2010 CO239 || 
|- id="2000 BN42" bgcolor=#E9E9E9
| 0 ||  || MBA-M || 17.40 || 1.8 km || multiple || 2000–2021 || 27 Nov 2021 || 72 || align=left | Disc.: Spacewatch || 
|- id="2000 BU42" bgcolor=#E9E9E9
| 0 ||  || MBA-M || 17.40 || 1.8 km || multiple || 2000–2021 || 31 Aug 2021 || 65 || align=left | Disc.: SpacewatchAlt.: 2013 YY89 || 
|- id="2000 BA43" bgcolor=#fefefe
| 0 ||  || MBA-I || 18.08 || data-sort-value="0.72" | 720 m || multiple || 2000–2021 || 13 Sep 2021 || 70 || align=left | Disc.: SpacewatchAdded on 11 May 2021Alt.: 2004 CY124, 2008 DX96 || 
|- id="2000 BR43" bgcolor=#E9E9E9
| 0 ||  || MBA-M || 17.49 || data-sort-value="0.94" | 940 m || multiple || 2000–2021 || 03 May 2021 || 139 || align=left | Disc.: SpacewatchAlt.: 2011 YF9 || 
|- id="2000 BY43" bgcolor=#d6d6d6
| 1 ||  || MBA-O || 17.2 || 2.0 km || multiple || 2000–2021 || 18 Jan 2021 || 52 || align=left | Disc.: Spacewatch || 
|- id="2000 BB44" bgcolor=#E9E9E9
| 0 ||  || MBA-M || 18.05 || data-sort-value="0.73" | 730 m || multiple || 2000–2021 || 12 May 2021 || 53 || align=left | Disc.: Spacewatch || 
|- id="2000 BF44" bgcolor=#d6d6d6
| 0 ||  || MBA-O || 17.0 || 2.2 km || multiple || 2000–2020 || 20 May 2020 || 119 || align=left | Disc.: SpacewatchAlt.: 2000 CJ150, 2008 WS77 || 
|- id="2000 BY45" bgcolor=#d6d6d6
| 0 ||  || MBA-O || 16.9 || 2.3 km || multiple || 2000–2020 || 10 Dec 2020 || 55 || align=left | Disc.: Spacewatch || 
|- id="2000 BW46" bgcolor=#d6d6d6
| 0 ||  || MBA-O || 16.5 || 2.8 km || multiple || 2000–2021 || 18 Jan 2021 || 96 || align=left | Disc.: SpacewatchAlt.: 2010 DG68, 2011 FC147, 2016 DA6 || 
|- id="2000 BR50" bgcolor=#d6d6d6
| 0 ||  || MBA-O || 16.9 || 2.3 km || multiple || 2000–2021 || 18 Jan 2021 || 65 || align=left | Disc.: SpacewatchAlt.: 2016 AN120 || 
|- id="2000 BV50" bgcolor=#d6d6d6
| 0 ||  || MBA-O || 16.2 || 3.2 km || multiple || 2000–2020 || 23 Oct 2020 || 109 || align=left | Disc.: Spacewatch || 
|- id="2000 BZ50" bgcolor=#d6d6d6
| 0 ||  || MBA-O || 16.9 || 2.3 km || multiple || 2000–2021 || 16 Jan 2021 || 62 || align=left | Disc.: Spacewatch || 
|- id="2000 BK52" bgcolor=#E9E9E9
| 0 ||  || MBA-M || 17.44 || data-sort-value="0.97" | 970 m || multiple || 1999–2021 || 08 May 2021 || 134 || align=left | Disc.: SpacewatchAlt.: 2002 QC72, 2013 EH151 || 
|- id="2000 BX52" bgcolor=#E9E9E9
| 0 ||  || MBA-M || 17.59 || 1.7 km || multiple || 2000–2021 || 26 Oct 2021 || 76 || align=left | Disc.: Spacewatch || 
|- id="2000 BZ52" bgcolor=#d6d6d6
| 0 ||  || MBA-O || 17.20 || 2.0 km || multiple || 2000–2021 || 10 Apr 2021 || 118 || align=left | Disc.: Spacewatch || 
|- id="2000 BA53" bgcolor=#fefefe
| 0 ||  || MBA-I || 18.7 || data-sort-value="0.54" | 540 m || multiple || 2000–2020 || 23 Sep 2020 || 75 || align=left | Disc.: Spacewatch || 
|- id="2000 BC53" bgcolor=#fefefe
| 0 ||  || MBA-I || 18.5 || data-sort-value="0.59" | 590 m || multiple || 2000–2021 || 06 Jan 2021 || 65 || align=left | Disc.: Spacewatch || 
|- id="2000 BF53" bgcolor=#d6d6d6
| 0 ||  || MBA-O || 16.6 || 2.7 km || multiple || 2000–2020 || 23 Oct 2020 || 43 || align=left | Disc.: Spacewatch || 
|- id="2000 BH53" bgcolor=#E9E9E9
| 0 ||  || MBA-M || 17.3 || 1.5 km || multiple || 2000–2020 || 23 Oct 2020 || 71 || align=left | Disc.: Spacewatch || 
|- id="2000 BJ53" bgcolor=#fefefe
| 0 ||  || MBA-I || 18.2 || data-sort-value="0.68" | 680 m || multiple || 2000–2019 || 24 Dec 2019 || 81 || align=left | Disc.: Spacewatch || 
|- id="2000 BK53" bgcolor=#fefefe
| 0 ||  || MBA-I || 18.3 || data-sort-value="0.65" | 650 m || multiple || 2000–2020 || 15 Dec 2020 || 80 || align=left | Disc.: Spacewatch || 
|- id="2000 BL53" bgcolor=#E9E9E9
| 0 ||  || MBA-M || 17.3 || 1.5 km || multiple || 2000–2021 || 06 Jan 2021 || 53 || align=left | Disc.: Spacewatch || 
|- id="2000 BM53" bgcolor=#C2FFFF
| 0 ||  || JT || 14.29 || 7.7 km || multiple || 1996–2021 || 09 Dec 2021 || 140 || align=left | Disc.: SpacewatchGreek camp (L4) || 
|- id="2000 BN53" bgcolor=#C2FFFF
| 0 ||  || JT || 14.19 || 8.1 km || multiple || 2000–2021 || 02 Dec 2021 || 139 || align=left | Disc.: SpacewatchGreek camp (L4)Alt.: 2010 CL219 || 
|- id="2000 BP53" bgcolor=#E9E9E9
| 0 ||  || MBA-M || 17.95 || data-sort-value="0.76" | 760 m || multiple || 2000–2021 || 02 May 2021 || 87 || align=left | Disc.: SpacewatchAdded on 22 July 2020 || 
|- id="2000 BQ53" bgcolor=#fefefe
| 0 ||  || MBA-I || 17.84 || data-sort-value="0.80" | 800 m || multiple || 2000–2022 || 27 Jan 2022 || 68 || align=left | Disc.: SpacewatchAdded on 17 January 2021 || 
|}
back to top

C 

|- id="2000 CA13" bgcolor=#FA8072
| 1 ||  || MCA || 18.01 || 1 km || multiple || 2000–2022 || 21 May 2022 || 104 || align=left | Disc.: LINEAR || 
|- id="2000 CL33" bgcolor=#FFC2E0
| 1 ||  || AMO || 18.3 || data-sort-value="0.78" | 780 m || multiple || 1995–2007 || 20 Dec 2007 || 70 || align=left | Disc.: LINEAR || 
|- id="2000 CM33" bgcolor=#FFC2E0
| 1 ||  || APO || 20.8 || data-sort-value="0.25" | 250 m || multiple || 2000–2014 || 28 Sep 2014 || 201 || align=left | Disc.: CSSPotentially hazardous object || 
|- id="2000 CN33" bgcolor=#FFC2E0
| 0 ||  || AMO || 19.57 || data-sort-value="0.43" | 430 m || multiple || 2000–2021 || 11 May 2021 || 172 || align=left | Disc.: LINEAR || 
|- id="2000 CO33" bgcolor=#FFC2E0
| 6 ||  || APO || 21.1 || data-sort-value="0.21" | 210 m || single || 39 days || 13 Mar 2000 || 68 || align=left | Disc.: LINEARPotentially hazardous objectAMO at MPC || 
|- id="2000 CN34" bgcolor=#E9E9E9
| 0 ||  || MBA-M || 17.58 || 1.3 km || multiple || 2000–2022 || 06 Jan 2022 || 41 || align=left | Disc.: Ondřejov Obs. || 
|- id="2000 CJ59" bgcolor=#FA8072
| 1 ||  || MCA || 18.1 || data-sort-value="0.71" | 710 m || multiple || 2000–2012 || 02 May 2012 || 135 || align=left | Disc.: LINEAR || 
|- id="2000 CK59" bgcolor=#FFC2E0
| 2 ||  || APO || 24.1 || data-sort-value="0.054" | 54 m || multiple || 2000–2017 || 16 Dec 2017 || 68 || align=left | Disc.: LINEARAMO at MPCAlt.: 2009 CU || 
|- id="2000 CP68" bgcolor=#d6d6d6
| 0 ||  || MBA-O || 16.7 || 2.5 km || multiple || 2000–2021 || 12 Jan 2021 || 85 || align=left | Disc.: SpacewatchAlt.: 2010 CL243, 2016 CN158 || 
|- id="2000 CX68" bgcolor=#d6d6d6
| 0 ||  || MBA-O || 17.4 || 1.8 km || multiple || 2000–2021 || 19 Jan 2021 || 110 || align=left | Disc.: SpacewatchAlt.: 2016 GJ71 || 
|- id="2000 CV69" bgcolor=#d6d6d6
| 0 ||  || MBA-O || 16.32 || 3.0 km || multiple || 2000–2021 || 02 Apr 2021 || 182 || align=left | Disc.: SpacewatchAlt.: 2016 BE44 || 
|- id="2000 CE72" bgcolor=#E9E9E9
| 0 ||  || MBA-M || 18.26 || data-sort-value="0.66" | 660 m || multiple || 2000–2021 || 15 Apr 2021 || 41 || align=left | Disc.: SpacewatchAlt.: 2015 XV77 || 
|- id="2000 CF72" bgcolor=#d6d6d6
| 0 ||  || MBA-O || 17.26 || 2.0 km || multiple || 2000–2021 || 06 Apr 2021 || 52 || align=left | Disc.: Spacewatch || 
|- id="2000 CF73" bgcolor=#fefefe
| 0 ||  || MBA-I || 17.9 || data-sort-value="0.78" | 780 m || multiple || 2000–2020 || 17 Dec 2020 || 67 || align=left | Disc.: Spacewatch || 
|- id="2000 CH73" bgcolor=#d6d6d6
| 0 ||  || MBA-O || 17.1 || 2.1 km || multiple || 2000–2017 || 24 Aug 2017 || 40 || align=left | Disc.: Spacewatch || 
|- id="2000 CK73" bgcolor=#E9E9E9
| 0 ||  || MBA-M || 17.25 || 1.1 km || multiple || 2000–2021 || 12 May 2021 || 147 || align=left | Disc.: SpacewatchAlt.: 2004 CN30, 2005 JH69, 2014 SO321 || 
|- id="2000 CN73" bgcolor=#d6d6d6
| 0 ||  || MBA-O || 16.7 || 2.5 km || multiple || 2000–2020 || 11 Oct 2020 || 55 || align=left | Disc.: SpacewatchAlt.: 2015 VF147 || 
|- id="2000 CR73" bgcolor=#d6d6d6
| 0 ||  || MBA-O || 16.8 || 2.4 km || multiple || 2000–2019 || 25 Sep 2019 || 66 || align=left | Disc.: SpacewatchAlt.: 2010 DZ102, 2016 CS153, 2018 PQ3 || 
|- id="2000 CM79" bgcolor=#E9E9E9
| 0 ||  || MBA-M || 18.7 || data-sort-value="0.76" | 760 m || multiple || 2000–2020 || 12 Dec 2020 || 49 || align=left | Disc.: Spacewatch || 
|- id="2000 CQ79" bgcolor=#fefefe
| 0 ||  = (619199) || MBA-I || 18.2 || data-sort-value="0.68" | 680 m || multiple || 2000–2017 || 03 Apr 2017 || 51 || align=left | Disc.: Spacewatch || 
|- id="2000 CU80" bgcolor=#d6d6d6
| – ||  || MBA-O || 17.2 || 2.0 km || single || 2 days || 12 Feb 2000 || 10 || align=left | Disc.: La Silla Obs. || 
|- id="2000 CR95" bgcolor=#E9E9E9
| 0 ||  || MBA-M || 16.85 || 2.4 km || multiple || 2000–2021 || 28 Nov 2021 || 110 || align=left | Disc.: SpacewatchAlt.: 2010 DL24, 2016 SN18 || 
|- id="2000 CB97" bgcolor=#d6d6d6
| 0 ||  || MBA-O || 17.0 || 2.2 km || multiple || 2000–2018 || 07 Aug 2018 || 50 || align=left | Disc.: La Silla Obs. || 
|- id="2000 CP101" bgcolor=#FFC2E0
| 1 ||  || APO || 19.9 || data-sort-value="0.37" | 370 m || multiple || 2000–2019 || 28 Feb 2019 || 200 || align=left | Disc.: LINEARPotentially hazardous object || 
|- id="2000 CR101" bgcolor=#FFC2E0
| 0 ||  || AMO || 20.28 || data-sort-value="0.31" | 310 m || multiple || 2000–2022 || 21 Jan 2022 || 234 || align=left | Disc.: Spacewatch || 
|- id="2000 CB103" bgcolor=#E9E9E9
| 0 ||  || MBA-M || 16.8 || 1.8 km || multiple || 2000–2021 || 17 Jan 2021 || 112 || align=left | Disc.: LINEARAlt.: 2017 EP6 || 
|- id="2000 CL104" bgcolor=#C2E0FF
| 2 ||  || TNO || 6.2 || 191 km || multiple || 2000–2020 || 01 Feb 2020 || 29 || align=left | Disc.: Kitt PeakLoUTNOs, cubewano (cold), BR-mag: 1.85; taxonomy: RR || 
|- id="2000 CM104" bgcolor=#C2E0FF
| 5 ||  || TNO || 7.48 || 110 km || multiple || 2000-2003 || 23 Dec 2003 || 9 || align=left | Disc.: Kitt PeakLoUTNOs, cubewano? || 
|- id="2000 CN104" bgcolor=#C2E0FF
| E ||  || TNO || 6.9 || 173 km || single || 25 days || 01 Mar 2000 || 4 || align=left | Disc.: Kitt PeakLoUTNOs, other TNO || 
|- id="2000 CO104" bgcolor=#C7FF8F
| 2 ||  || CEN || 10.0 || 56 km || multiple || 2000–2015 || 23 Mar 2015 || 15 || align=left | Disc.: Kitt Peak || 
|- id="2000 CP104" bgcolor=#C2E0FF
| 3 ||  || TNO || 6.8 || 224 km || multiple || 2000–2019 || 05 Apr 2019 || 25 || align=left | Disc.: Kitt PeakLoUTNOs, cubewano (hot) || 
|- id="2000 CQ104" bgcolor=#C2E0FF
| 3 ||  || TNO || 8.0 || 91 km || multiple || 2000–2014 || 02 Mar 2014 || 28 || align=left | Disc.: Kitt PeakLoUTNOs, res3:4, BR-mag: 1.31; taxonomy: BR || 
|- id="2000 CR104" bgcolor=#E9E9E9
| 0 ||  || MBA-M || 17.04 || 2.2 km || multiple || 2000-2021 || 01 Dec 2021 || 119 || align=left | Disc.: Kitt Peak Alt.: 2010 CP46, 2011 RO29 || 
|- id="2000 CE105" bgcolor=#C2E0FF
| 3 ||  || TNO || 7.07 || 128 km || multiple || 2000–2021 || 11 Jan 2021 || 24 || align=left | Disc.: Kitt PeakLoUTNOs, cubewano (cold) || 
|- id="2000 CF105" bgcolor=#C2E0FF
| 3 ||  || TNO || 7.11 || 64 km || multiple || 2000–2021 || 20 Mar 2021 || 39 || align=left | Disc.: Kitt PeakLoUTNOs, cubewano (cold), albedo: 0.300; BR-mag: 1.70; binary: 50 km || 
|- id="2000 CG105" bgcolor=#C2E0FF
| 2 ||  || TNO || 6.6 || 199 km || multiple || 2000–2017 || 17 Mar 2017 || 81 || align=left | Disc.: Kitt PeakLoUTNOs, other TNO, BR-mag: 1.17 || 
|- id="2000 CJ105" bgcolor=#C2E0FF
| 1 ||  || TNO || 6.2 || 295 km || multiple || 2000–2018 || 10 Apr 2018 || 122 || align=left | Disc.: Kitt PeakLoUTNOs, cubewano (hot), BR-mag: 1.76; taxonomy: RR || 
|- id="2000 CK105" bgcolor=#C2E0FF
| 3 ||  || TNO || 6.1 || 285 km || multiple || 2000–2017 || 03 Mar 2017 || 32 || align=left | Disc.: Kitt PeakLoUTNOs, plutino || 
|- id="2000 CL105" bgcolor=#C2E0FF
| 3 ||  || TNO || 6.9 || 139 km || multiple || 2000–2018 || 18 Mar 2018 || 29 || align=left | Disc.: Kitt PeakLoUTNOs, cubewano (cold), BR-mag: 1.52 || 
|- id="2000 CO105" bgcolor=#C2E0FF
| 2 ||  || TNO || 5.9 || 275 km || multiple || 2000–2013 || 13 Mar 2013 || 61 || align=left | Disc.: Kitt PeakLoUTNOs, other TNO, BR-mag: 1.52 || 
|- id="2000 CP105" bgcolor=#C2E0FF
| E ||  || TNO || 7.7 || 109 km || single || 21 days || 26 Feb 2000 || 4 || align=left | Disc.: Kitt PeakLoUTNOs, SDO || 
|- id="2000 CS105" bgcolor=#C2E0FF
| E ||  || TNO || 7.3 || 119 km || single || 24 days || 01 Mar 2000 || 4 || align=left | Disc.: Kitt PeakLoUTNOs, cubewano? || 
|- id="2000 CU105" bgcolor=#E9E9E9
| 2 ||  || MBA-M || 18.31 || data-sort-value="0.63" | 630 m || multiple || 2000–2022 || 31 July 2022 || 41 || align=left | Disc.: Kitt Peak Obs.Added on 24 December 2021 || 
|- id="2000 CY105" bgcolor=#C2E0FF
| E ||  || TNO || 6.6 || 164 km || single || 21 days || 26 Feb 2000 || 4 || align=left | Disc.: Kitt PeakLoUTNOs, cubewano? || 
|- id="2000 CC106" bgcolor=#fefefe
| 0 ||  || MBA-I || 18.0 || data-sort-value="0.75" | 750 m || multiple || 1995–2021 || 18 Jan 2021 || 67 || align=left | Disc.: Kitt Peak || 
|- id="2000 CD106" bgcolor=#fefefe
| 0 ||  || MBA-I || 18.01 || data-sort-value="0.74" | 740 m || multiple || 2000–2021 || 01 Nov 2021 || 153 || align=left | Disc.: Kitt PeakAlt.: 2013 AU34 || 
|- id="2000 CJ106" bgcolor=#E9E9E9
| 0 ||  || MBA-M || 17.9 || 1.1 km || multiple || 1996–2021 || 18 Jan 2021 || 96 || align=left | Disc.: Kitt Peak || 
|- id="2000 CP106" bgcolor=#d6d6d6
| 0 ||  || MBA-O || 16.82 || 2.4 km || multiple || 2000–2021 || 06 May 2021 || 100 || align=left | Disc.: Kitt PeakAlt.: 2014 WE295 || 
|- id="2000 CH107" bgcolor=#fefefe
| 0 ||  || MBA-I || 18.3 || data-sort-value="0.65" | 650 m || multiple || 2000–2021 || 08 Jun 2021 || 106 || align=left | Disc.: Kitt Peak || 
|- id="2000 CP107" bgcolor=#d6d6d6
| 0 ||  || MBA-O || 17.99 || 1.4 km || multiple || 2000–2021 || 15 Jan 2021 || 40 || align=left | Disc.: Kitt Peak Obs.Added on 9 March 2021Alt.: 2020 XL12 || 
|- id="2000 CS109" bgcolor=#fefefe
| 0 ||  || MBA-I || 18.5 || data-sort-value="0.59" | 590 m || multiple || 2000–2019 || 03 Jul 2019 || 26 || align=left | Disc.: Kitt Peak || 
|- id="2000 CF110" bgcolor=#d6d6d6
| 0 ||  || MBA-O || 16.8 || 2.4 km || multiple || 2000–2021 || 10 Feb 2021 || 41 || align=left | Disc.: Kitt Peak Obs.Added on 11 May 2021Alt.: 2021 BR9 || 
|- id="2000 CX110" bgcolor=#fefefe
| 1 ||  || MBA-I || 18.48 || data-sort-value="0.60" | 600 m || multiple || 1993–2021 || 11 May 2021 || 71 || align=left | Disc.: Kitt PeakAlt.: 2007 DP81 || 
|- id="2000 CZ110" bgcolor=#d6d6d6
| 0 ||  || MBA-O || 17.39 || 1.9 km || multiple || 2000–2021 || 09 May 2021 || 41 || align=left | Disc.: Kitt Peak || 
|- id="2000 CA111" bgcolor=#E9E9E9
| 0 ||  || MBA-M || 18.48 || data-sort-value="0.60" | 600 m || multiple || 2000–2021 || 09 May 2021 || 46 || align=left | Disc.: Kitt PeakAlt.: 2021 FF14 || 
|- id="2000 CH111" bgcolor=#E9E9E9
| 0 ||  || MBA-M || 16.96 || 1.7 km || multiple || 2000–2021 || 07 Apr 2021 || 138 || align=left | Disc.: Kitt PeakAlt.: 2015 XP155 || 
|- id="2000 CE114" bgcolor=#E9E9E9
| 2 ||  || MBA-M || 17.6 || 1.7 km || multiple || 2000–2018 || 17 Mar 2018 || 48 || align=left | Disc.: Spacewatch || 
|- id="2000 CN114" bgcolor=#C2E0FF
| 2 ||  || TNO || 7.1 || 126 km || multiple || 2000–2020 || 18 Feb 2020 || 22 || align=left | Disc.: Kitt PeakLoUTNOs, cubewano (cold) || 
|- id="2000 CO114" bgcolor=#C2E0FF
| E ||  || TNO || 6.9 || 173 km || single || 54 days || 30 Mar 2000 || 4 || align=left | Disc.: Kitt PeakLoUTNOs, other TNO || 
|- id="2000 CP114" bgcolor=#C2E0FF
| E ||  || TNO || 8.0 || 119 km || single || 53 days || 30 Mar 2000 || 4 || align=left | Disc.: Kitt PeakLoUTNOs, plutino? || 
|- id="2000 CG119" bgcolor=#d6d6d6
| 0 ||  || MBA-O || 16.3 || 3.1 km || multiple || 2000–2021 || 17 Jan 2021 || 90 || align=left | Disc.: Kitt PeakAlt.: 2013 QE63 || 
|- id="2000 CP119" bgcolor=#E9E9E9
| 0 ||  || MBA-M || 17.9 || 1.1 km || multiple || 2000–2019 || 07 Oct 2019 || 36 || align=left | Disc.: SpacewatchAdded on 21 August 2021 || 
|- id="2000 CV119" bgcolor=#E9E9E9
| 0 ||  || MBA-M || 17.5 || 1.8 km || multiple || 2000–2020 || 17 Sep 2020 || 61 || align=left | Disc.: SpacewatchAdded on 17 January 2021 || 
|- id="2000 CW119" bgcolor=#d6d6d6
| 0 ||  || MBA-O || 17.06 || 2.2 km || multiple || 2000–2022 || 25 Jan 2022 || 50 || align=left | Disc.: Spacewatch || 
|- id="2000 CU120" bgcolor=#d6d6d6
| 0 ||  || MBA-O || 17.2 || 2.0 km || multiple || 2000–2020 || 08 Dec 2020 || 85 || align=left | Disc.: Kitt Peak Obs.Added on 30 September 2021Alt.: 2014 SL7 || 
|- id="2000 CT126" bgcolor=#E9E9E9
| 0 ||  || MBA-M || 18.04 || data-sort-value="0.73" | 730 m || multiple || 1998–2021 || 15 Apr 2021 || 68 || align=left | Disc.: SpacewatchAdded on 22 July 2020Alt.: 2016 AC86 || 
|- id="2000 CA127" bgcolor=#fefefe
| 0 ||  || MBA-I || 18.6 || data-sort-value="0.57" | 570 m || multiple || 2000–2020 || 24 Jan 2020 || 83 || align=left | Disc.: SpacewatchAlt.: 2017 DQ1 || 
|- id="2000 CE127" bgcolor=#d6d6d6
| 0 ||  || MBA-O || 16.98 || 2.2 km || multiple || 2000–2021 || 14 Apr 2021 || 120 || align=left | Disc.: Spacewatch || 
|- id="2000 CN127" bgcolor=#E9E9E9
| 0 ||  || MBA-M || 17.0 || 1.2 km || multiple || 2000–2021 || 09 Jun 2021 || 136 || align=left | Disc.: SpacewatchAlt.: 2009 HN72, 2015 XL382 || 
|- id="2000 CT127" bgcolor=#d6d6d6
| 0 ||  || MBA-O || 16.28 || 3.1 km || multiple || 1994–2022 || 05 Jan 2022 || 106 || align=left | Disc.: SpacewatchAlt.: 2015 RO17 || 
|- id="2000 CG129" bgcolor=#d6d6d6
| 0 ||  || MBA-O || 15.57 || 4.3 km || multiple || 2000–2022 || 21 Jan 2022 || 331 || align=left | Disc.: SpacewatchAlt.: 2010 AE103 || 
|- id="2000 CH129" bgcolor=#E9E9E9
| 0 ||  || MBA-M || 17.99 || 1.4 km || multiple || 2000–2021 || 28 Nov 2021 || 41 || align=left | Disc.: SpacewatchAdded on 30 September 2021Alt.: 2017 WF67 || 
|- id="2000 CX129" bgcolor=#d6d6d6
| 0 ||  || MBA-O || 16.84 || 2.4 km || multiple || 2000–2021 || 28 Nov 2021 || 65 || align=left | Disc.: Spacewatch || 
|- id="2000 CB130" bgcolor=#FA8072
| 1 ||  || MCA || 19.0 || data-sort-value="0.47" | 470 m || multiple || 2000–2011 || 28 Jul 2011 || 83 || align=left | Disc.: SpacewatchAlt.: 2000 CB73, 2005 XB28 || 
|- id="2000 CD130" bgcolor=#d6d6d6
| 0 ||  || MBA-O || 16.4 || 2.9 km || multiple || 2000–2019 || 29 Sep 2019 || 50 || align=left | Disc.: Spacewatch || 
|- id="2000 CJ130" bgcolor=#E9E9E9
| E ||  || MBA-M || 17.0 || 2.2 km || single || 5 days || 08 Feb 2000 || 9 || align=left | Disc.: Spacewatch || 
|- id="2000 CR130" bgcolor=#fefefe
| 0 ||  || MBA-I || 18.09 || data-sort-value="0.72" | 720 m || multiple || 2000–2021 || 03 Dec 2021 || 44 || align=left | Disc.: SpacewatchAlt.: 2015 BU245 || 
|- id="2000 CS130" bgcolor=#E9E9E9
| 0 ||  || MBA-M || 17.2 || 1.5 km || multiple || 2000–2019 || 03 Oct 2019 || 85 || align=left | Disc.: SpacewatchAlt.: 2000 CO148, 2002 TK366, 2005 HV5, 2005 JO180 || 
|- id="2000 CQ131" bgcolor=#fefefe
| 0 ||  || MBA-I || 18.62 || data-sort-value="0.56" | 560 m || multiple || 2000–2021 || 06 Nov 2021 || 36 || align=left | Disc.: SpacewatchAlt.: 2015 BF564 || 
|- id="2000 CK132" bgcolor=#FA8072
| 1 ||  || MCA || 18.08 || data-sort-value="0.72" | 720 m || multiple || 2000–2019 || 19 Sep 2019 || 41 || align=left | Disc.: SpacewatchAlt.: 2019 QZ6 || 
|- id="2000 CN132" bgcolor=#d6d6d6
| 0 ||  || MBA-O || 16.6 || 2.7 km || multiple || 2000–2020 || 12 Apr 2020 || 76 || align=left | Disc.: SpacewatchAlt.: 2008 UT307 || 
|- id="2000 CP132" bgcolor=#E9E9E9
| 0 ||  || MBA-M || 18.4 || data-sort-value="0.88" | 880 m || multiple || 2000–2021 || 18 Jan 2021 || 110 || align=left | Disc.: SpacewatchAlt.: 2017 BZ174 || 
|- id="2000 CS132" bgcolor=#fefefe
| 0 ||  || MBA-I || 18.2 || data-sort-value="0.68" | 680 m || multiple || 2000–2021 || 08 Jan 2021 || 62 || align=left | Disc.: SpacewatchAlt.: 2015 PO111 || 
|- id="2000 CV132" bgcolor=#d6d6d6
| 0 ||  || MBA-O || 17.6 || 1.7 km || multiple || 2000–2021 || 18 Jan 2021 || 39 || align=left | Disc.: SpacewatchAdded on 22 July 2020 || 
|- id="2000 CW132" bgcolor=#fefefe
| 0 ||  || MBA-I || 18.5 || data-sort-value="0.59" | 590 m || multiple || 2000–2020 || 16 Aug 2020 || 61 || align=left | Disc.: Spacewatch || 
|- id="2000 CZ132" bgcolor=#E9E9E9
| 0 ||  || MBA-M || 18.04 || data-sort-value="0.73" | 730 m || multiple || 2000–2021 || 03 Apr 2021 || 85 || align=left | Disc.: Spacewatch || 
|- id="2000 CF133" bgcolor=#E9E9E9
| 0 ||  || MBA-M || 18.3 || data-sort-value="0.92" | 920 m || multiple || 2000–2020 || 11 Nov 2020 || 30 || align=left | Disc.: Spacewatch || 
|- id="2000 CS133" bgcolor=#d6d6d6
| 0 ||  || MBA-O || 16.8 || 2.4 km || multiple || 2000–2020 || 21 Jan 2020 || 117 || align=left | Disc.: SpacewatchAlt.: 2010 FT42, 2014 WV417 || 
|- id="2000 CA134" bgcolor=#d6d6d6
| 0 ||  || MBA-O || 17.38 || 1.9 km || multiple || 2000–2021 || 09 Apr 2021 || 52 || align=left | Disc.: Spacewatch || 
|- id="2000 CM134" bgcolor=#fefefe
| 0 ||  || MBA-I || 17.8 || data-sort-value="0.82" | 820 m || multiple || 2000–2021 || 18 Jan 2021 || 93 || align=left | Disc.: SpacewatchAlt.: 2007 BU62, 2011 FR68, 2015 KV63 || 
|- id="2000 CO136" bgcolor=#E9E9E9
| 0 ||  || MBA-M || 17.78 || 1.2 km || multiple || 2000–2022 || 27 Jan 2022 || 51 || align=left | Disc.: SpacewatchAdded on 17 January 2021 || 
|- id="2000 CH137" bgcolor=#FA8072
| 3 ||  || MCA || 19.2 || data-sort-value="0.43" | 430 m || multiple || 2000–2020 || 25 Feb 2020 || 33 || align=left | Disc.: SpacewatchAdded on 11 May 2021Alt.: 2020 BT22 || 
|- id="2000 CS137" bgcolor=#d6d6d6
| 0 ||  || MBA-O || 16.9 || 2.3 km || multiple || 2000–2021 || 12 Feb 2021 || 55 || align=left | Disc.: SpacewatchAlt.: 2016 DU41 || 
|- id="2000 CC138" bgcolor=#d6d6d6
| 0 ||  || MBA-O || 16.6 || 2.7 km || multiple || 2000–2020 || 18 Sep 2020 || 66 || align=left | Disc.: SpacewatchAdded on 11 May 2021 || 
|- id="2000 CU138" bgcolor=#d6d6d6
| 0 ||  || MBA-O || 16.8 || 2.4 km || multiple || 2000–2020 || 20 Apr 2020 || 67 || align=left | Disc.: SpacewatchAdded on 22 July 2020Alt.: 2005 EJ311 || 
|- id="2000 CV138" bgcolor=#d6d6d6
| 0 ||  || MBA-O || 16.4 || 2.9 km || multiple || 2000–2020 || 24 Dec 2020 || 131 || align=left | Disc.: SpacewatchAlt.: 2010 EB185, 2011 EF56, 2014 WF389, 2016 AC121 || 
|- id="2000 CW138" bgcolor=#E9E9E9
| 0 ||  || MBA-M || 17.6 || 1.7 km || multiple || 2000–2020 || 13 Sep 2020 || 59 || align=left | Disc.: Spacewatch || 
|- id="2000 CA139" bgcolor=#E9E9E9
| 0 ||  || MBA-M || 18.1 || 1.0 km || multiple || 2000–2021 || 19 Feb 2021 || 46 || align=left | Disc.: SpacewatchAdded on 17 June 2021 || 
|- id="2000 CO139" bgcolor=#d6d6d6
| 2 ||  || MBA-O || 17.0 || 2.2 km || multiple || 2000–2017 || 23 Mar 2017 || 22 || align=left | Disc.: SpacewatchAdded on 19 October 2020Alt.: 2017 DG57 || 
|- id="2000 CP139" bgcolor=#d6d6d6
| 0 ||  || MBA-O || 16.20 || 3.2 km || multiple || 1998–2021 || 06 May 2021 || 172 || align=left | Disc.: Spacewatch || 
|- id="2000 CO140" bgcolor=#E9E9E9
| 2 ||  || MBA-M || 18.0 || 1.3 km || multiple || 2000-2018 || 20 Jan 2018 || 29 || align=left | Disc.: Spacewatch || 
|- id="2000 CR141" bgcolor=#d6d6d6
| 0 ||  || MBA-O || 17.21 || 2.0 km || multiple || 2000–2022 || 08 Jan 2022 || 49 || align=left | Disc.: SpacewatchAdded on 17 January 2021 || 
|- id="2000 CD142" bgcolor=#E9E9E9
| 0 ||  || MBA-M || 17.2 || 1.5 km || multiple || 2000–2021 || 18 Jan 2021 || 109 || align=left | Disc.: LINEARAlt.: 2007 VT242 || 
|- id="2000 CS142" bgcolor=#fefefe
| 0 ||  || MBA-I || 18.6 || data-sort-value="0.57" | 570 m || multiple || 2000–2018 || 18 Aug 2018 || 24 || align=left | Disc.: Spacewatch || 
|- id="2000 CU142" bgcolor=#fefefe
| 0 ||  || MBA-I || 18.2 || data-sort-value="0.68" | 680 m || multiple || 2000–2021 || 03 May 2021 || 61 || align=left | Disc.: SpacewatchAdded on 11 May 2021 || 
|- id="2000 CW142" bgcolor=#fefefe
| 0 ||  || MBA-I || 18.2 || data-sort-value="0.68" | 680 m || multiple || 2000–2019 || 05 Jul 2019 || 52 || align=left | Disc.: Spacewatch || 
|- id="2000 CF143" bgcolor=#E9E9E9
| 0 ||  || MBA-M || 17.33 || 1.9 km || multiple || 2000–2022 || 06 Jan 2022 || 81 || align=left | Disc.: SpacewatchAlt.: 2010 FR102, 2014 HB165 || 
|- id="2000 CT143" bgcolor=#E9E9E9
| 0 ||  || MBA-M || 17.4 || 1.4 km || multiple || 2000–2020 || 14 Nov 2020 || 72 || align=left | Disc.: SpacewatchAlt.: 2009 DB102 || 
|- id="2000 CD144" bgcolor=#fefefe
| 0 ||  || MBA-I || 17.8 || data-sort-value="0.82" | 820 m || multiple || 2000–2020 || 09 Dec 2020 || 80 || align=left | Disc.: Spacewatch || 
|- id="2000 CG144" bgcolor=#E9E9E9
| 0 ||  || MBA-M || 17.5 || 1.3 km || multiple || 2000–2020 || 20 Dec 2020 || 81 || align=left | Disc.: Kitt Peak Obs.Added on 17 June 2021Alt.: 2007 TD117 || 
|- id="2000 CL144" bgcolor=#d6d6d6
| 0 ||  || MBA-O || 16.4 || 2.9 km || multiple || 2000–2021 || 18 Feb 2021 || 104 || align=left | Disc.: Kitt PeakAlt.: 2008 TA162 || 
|- id="2000 CQ148" bgcolor=#fefefe
| 0 ||  || MBA-I || 18.3 || data-sort-value="0.65" | 650 m || multiple || 2000–2018 || 12 Apr 2018 || 70 || align=left | Disc.: SpacewatchAlt.: 2015 MM68 || 
|- id="2000 CV149" bgcolor=#E9E9E9
| 1 ||  || MBA-M || 18.48 || data-sort-value="0.60" | 600 m || multiple || 2000–2021 || 14 Apr 2021 || 58 || align=left | Disc.: SpacewatchAlt.: 2015 XM274 || 
|- id="2000 CB150" bgcolor=#d6d6d6
| 0 ||  || MBA-O || 16.7 || 2.5 km || multiple || 1995–2021 || 18 Jan 2021 || 62 || align=left | Disc.: SpacewatchAlt.: 2011 GF40, 2016 CT207 || 
|- id="2000 CH150" bgcolor=#d6d6d6
| 0 ||  || MBA-O || 16.05 || 3.4 km || multiple || 2000–2022 || 25 Jan 2022 || 131 || align=left | Disc.: SDSSAlt.: 2011 DR39 || 
|- id="2000 CM150" bgcolor=#fefefe
| 0 ||  || MBA-I || 18.8 || data-sort-value="0.52" | 520 m || multiple || 2000–2019 || 11 May 2019 || 49 || align=left | Disc.: SpacewatchAlt.: 2015 FL181 || 
|- id="2000 CR150" bgcolor=#fefefe
| 0 ||  || MBA-I || 18.6 || data-sort-value="0.57" | 570 m || multiple || 2000–2018 || 15 Apr 2018 || 34 || align=left | Disc.: SpacewatchAlt.: 2000 DP90 || 
|- id="2000 CV150" bgcolor=#E9E9E9
| 0 ||  || MBA-M || 16.94 || 1.7 km || multiple || 2000–2021 || 09 May 2021 || 159 || align=left | Disc.: CSS || 
|- id="2000 CW150" bgcolor=#d6d6d6
| 0 ||  || MBA-O || 16.31 || 3.0 km || multiple || 2000–2021 || 13 May 2021 || 152 || align=left | Disc.: Spacewatch || 
|- id="2000 CZ150" bgcolor=#fefefe
| 0 ||  || MBA-I || 18.2 || data-sort-value="0.68" | 680 m || multiple || 2000–2020 || 14 Dec 2020 || 127 || align=left | Disc.: Spacewatch || 
|- id="2000 CC151" bgcolor=#d6d6d6
| 0 ||  || MBA-O || 17.1 || 2.1 km || multiple || 2000–2020 || 23 Mar 2020 || 64 || align=left | Disc.: Kitt Peak || 
|- id="2000 CE151" bgcolor=#E9E9E9
| 0 ||  || MBA-M || 17.37 || 1.9 km || multiple || 2000–2021 || 28 Nov 2021 || 80 || align=left | Disc.: Kitt Peak || 
|- id="2000 CF151" bgcolor=#E9E9E9
| 0 ||  || MBA-M || 17.02 || 2.2 km || multiple || 2000–2021 || 30 Nov 2021 || 105 || align=left | Disc.: SDSS || 
|- id="2000 CJ151" bgcolor=#fefefe
| 0 ||  || MBA-I || 18.4 || data-sort-value="0.62" | 620 m || multiple || 2000–2020 || 10 Dec 2020 || 60 || align=left | Disc.: Kitt Peak || 
|- id="2000 CL151" bgcolor=#fefefe
| 0 ||  || MBA-I || 18.2 || data-sort-value="0.68" | 680 m || multiple || 1994–2020 || 10 Dec 2020 || 81 || align=left | Disc.: Kitt Peak || 
|- id="2000 CM151" bgcolor=#d6d6d6
| 0 ||  || MBA-O || 17.2 || 2.0 km || multiple || 2000–2020 || 21 Apr 2020 || 51 || align=left | Disc.: Kitt Peak || 
|- id="2000 CN151" bgcolor=#d6d6d6
| 0 ||  || MBA-O || 17.31 || 1.9 km || multiple || 2000–2021 || 15 Apr 2021 || 67 || align=left | Disc.: Kitt PeakAlt.: 2006 HU112 || 
|- id="2000 CO151" bgcolor=#fefefe
| 0 ||  || MBA-I || 17.98 || data-sort-value="0.75" | 750 m || multiple || 2000–2021 || 08 Aug 2021 || 99 || align=left | Disc.: SpacewatchAlt.: 2010 GT183 || 
|- id="2000 CP151" bgcolor=#d6d6d6
| 0 ||  || MBA-O || 16.53 || 2.8 km || multiple || 2000–2022 || 27 Jan 2022 || 87 || align=left | Disc.: Kitt Peak || 
|- id="2000 CQ151" bgcolor=#fefefe
| 0 ||  || MBA-I || 18.3 || data-sort-value="0.65" | 650 m || multiple || 2000–2020 || 08 Dec 2020 || 74 || align=left | Disc.: Kitt Peak || 
|- id="2000 CR151" bgcolor=#E9E9E9
| 0 ||  || MBA-M || 17.41 || 1.8 km || multiple || 1993–2021 || 28 Oct 2021 || 104 || align=left | Disc.: Spacewatch || 
|- id="2000 CS151" bgcolor=#fefefe
| 0 ||  || MBA-I || 18.21 || data-sort-value="0.68" | 680 m || multiple || 2000–2021 || 27 Oct 2021 || 106 || align=left | Disc.: Kitt Peak || 
|- id="2000 CT151" bgcolor=#d6d6d6
| 0 ||  || MBA-O || 16.7 || 2.5 km || multiple || 2000–2021 || 06 Jan 2021 || 79 || align=left | Disc.: Spacewatch || 
|- id="2000 CV151" bgcolor=#E9E9E9
| 0 ||  || MBA-M || 17.3 || 1.9 km || multiple || 2000–2020 || 17 Sep 2020 || 50 || align=left | Disc.: Spacewatch || 
|- id="2000 CW151" bgcolor=#fefefe
| 0 ||  || MBA-I || 18.2 || data-sort-value="0.68" | 680 m || multiple || 2000–2020 || 06 Dec 2020 || 71 || align=left | Disc.: Spacewatch || 
|- id="2000 CX151" bgcolor=#d6d6d6
| 0 ||  = (619200) || MBA-O || 16.9 || 2.3 km || multiple || 2000–2019 || 05 Feb 2019 || 49 || align=left | Disc.: SDSS || 
|- id="2000 CY151" bgcolor=#E9E9E9
| 0 ||  || MBA-M || 17.1 || 1.6 km || multiple || 2000–2021 || 07 Jan 2021 || 105 || align=left | Disc.: SDSSAlt.: 2010 KM95 || 
|- id="2000 CB152" bgcolor=#fefefe
| 0 ||  || MBA-I || 17.54 || data-sort-value="0.92" | 920 m || multiple || 2000–2021 || 13 Apr 2021 || 69 || align=left | Disc.: Spacewatch || 
|- id="2000 CD152" bgcolor=#fefefe
| 0 ||  || MBA-I || 18.79 || data-sort-value="0.52" | 520 m || multiple || 2000–2021 || 29 Nov 2021 || 57 || align=left | Disc.: Kitt Peak || 
|- id="2000 CE152" bgcolor=#fefefe
| 0 ||  || MBA-I || 18.61 || data-sort-value="0.56" | 560 m || multiple || 2000–2021 || 30 Oct 2021 || 54 || align=left | Disc.: Spacewatch || 
|- id="2000 CG152" bgcolor=#fefefe
| 0 ||  || MBA-I || 18.3 || data-sort-value="0.65" | 650 m || multiple || 2000–2020 || 14 Dec 2020 || 93 || align=left | Disc.: Kitt Peak || 
|- id="2000 CH152" bgcolor=#d6d6d6
| 0 ||  || MBA-O || 17.09 || 2.1 km || multiple || 1996–2021 || 07 Jul 2021 || 70 || align=left | Disc.: SDSS || 
|- id="2000 CJ152" bgcolor=#fefefe
| 0 ||  || MBA-I || 18.63 || data-sort-value="0.56" | 560 m || multiple || 2000–2022 || 26 Jan 2022 || 50 || align=left | Disc.: Kitt Peak || 
|- id="2000 CL152" bgcolor=#d6d6d6
| 0 ||  || MBA-O || 16.8 || 2.4 km || multiple || 2000–2021 || 06 Jan 2021 || 67 || align=left | Disc.: SpacewatchAlt.: 2016 BD47 || 
|- id="2000 CM152" bgcolor=#d6d6d6
| 0 ||  || MBA-O || 17.1 || 2.1 km || multiple || 2000–2019 || 27 Sep 2019 || 44 || align=left | Disc.: Kitt Peak || 
|- id="2000 CN152" bgcolor=#C2FFFF
| 0 ||  || JT || 14.9 || 5.8 km || multiple || 2000–2016 || 25 Oct 2016 || 33 || align=left | Disc.: Kitt Peak || 
|- id="2000 CO152" bgcolor=#fefefe
| 0 ||  || MBA-I || 18.71 || data-sort-value="0.54" | 540 m || multiple || 2000–2021 || 03 Apr 2021 || 37 || align=left | Disc.: Kitt Peak || 
|- id="2000 CP152" bgcolor=#E9E9E9
| 0 ||  || MBA-M || 17.87 || 1.5 km || multiple || 2000–2021 || 28 Nov 2021 || 46 || align=left | Disc.: Kitt Peak || 
|- id="2000 CQ152" bgcolor=#d6d6d6
| 0 ||  || MBA-O || 17.0 || 2.2 km || multiple || 2000–2020 || 24 Dec 2020 || 43 || align=left | Disc.: Spacewatch || 
|- id="2000 CS152" bgcolor=#E9E9E9
| 0 ||  || MBA-M || 17.8 || 1.2 km || multiple || 2000–2019 || 28 Aug 2019 || 61 || align=left | Disc.: Kitt Peak || 
|- id="2000 CT152" bgcolor=#fefefe
| 0 ||  || MBA-I || 17.8 || data-sort-value="0.82" | 820 m || multiple || 2000–2016 || 10 Oct 2016 || 32 || align=left | Disc.: SDSS || 
|- id="2000 CU152" bgcolor=#d6d6d6
| 0 ||  || MBA-O || 16.8 || 2.4 km || multiple || 2000–2018 || 12 Sep 2018 || 34 || align=left | Disc.: SDSS || 
|- id="2000 CW152" bgcolor=#d6d6d6
| 0 ||  || MBA-O || 16.07 || 3.4 km || multiple || 2000–2022 || 21 Jan 2022 || 107 || align=left | Disc.: SDSSAlt.: 2010 DL26 || 
|- id="2000 CX152" bgcolor=#fefefe
| 0 ||  || MBA-I || 18.59 || data-sort-value="0.57" | 570 m || multiple || 2000–2021 || 30 Jul 2021 || 85 || align=left | Disc.: Kitt Peak || 
|- id="2000 CY152" bgcolor=#d6d6d6
| 0 ||  || MBA-O || 16.9 || 2.3 km || multiple || 2000–2019 || 03 Nov 2019 || 39 || align=left | Disc.: SDSS || 
|- id="2000 CZ152" bgcolor=#E9E9E9
| 2 ||  || MBA-M || 18.3 || data-sort-value="0.65" | 650 m || multiple || 2000–2020 || 22 Mar 2020 || 47 || align=left | Disc.: Spacewatch || 
|- id="2000 CA153" bgcolor=#d6d6d6
| 0 ||  || MBA-O || 16.1 || 3.4 km || multiple || 2000–2020 || 28 Apr 2020 || 40 || align=left | Disc.: Spacewatch || 
|- id="2000 CB153" bgcolor=#fefefe
| 0 ||  || MBA-I || 19.0 || data-sort-value="0.47" | 470 m || multiple || 2000–2017 || 19 Feb 2017 || 39 || align=left | Disc.: SDSS || 
|- id="2000 CC153" bgcolor=#fefefe
| 0 ||  || MBA-I || 19.10 || data-sort-value="0.45" | 450 m || multiple || 2000–2021 || 07 Sep 2021 || 40 || align=left | Disc.: Kitt Peak || 
|- id="2000 CD153" bgcolor=#E9E9E9
| 2 ||  || MBA-M || 18.9 || data-sort-value="0.49" | 490 m || multiple || 2000–2020 || 15 Feb 2020 || 45 || align=left | Disc.: Spacewatch || 
|- id="2000 CE153" bgcolor=#d6d6d6
| 0 ||  || MBA-O || 17.0 || 2.2 km || multiple || 2000–2021 || 09 Jan 2021 || 60 || align=left | Disc.: SDSSAlt.: 2016 AC154 || 
|- id="2000 CF153" bgcolor=#E9E9E9
| 0 ||  || MBA-M || 17.57 || 1.7 km || multiple || 2000–2022 || 27 Jan 2022 || 92 || align=left | Disc.: SDSS || 
|- id="2000 CG153" bgcolor=#fefefe
| 0 ||  || MBA-I || 17.6 || data-sort-value="0.90" | 900 m || multiple || 2000–2019 || 25 Sep 2019 || 77 || align=left | Disc.: SDSS || 
|- id="2000 CH153" bgcolor=#fefefe
| 0 ||  || MBA-I || 18.24 || data-sort-value="0.67" | 670 m || multiple || 2000–2021 || 09 Apr 2021 || 93 || align=left | Disc.: Spacewatch || 
|- id="2000 CK153" bgcolor=#fefefe
| 0 ||  || MBA-I || 17.7 || data-sort-value="0.86" | 860 m || multiple || 2000–2020 || 07 Dec 2020 || 134 || align=left | Disc.: SDSS || 
|- id="2000 CL153" bgcolor=#fefefe
| 0 ||  || MBA-I || 18.07 || data-sort-value="0.72" | 720 m || multiple || 2000–2021 || 07 Apr 2021 || 93 || align=left | Disc.: Spacewatch || 
|- id="2000 CN153" bgcolor=#fefefe
| 0 ||  || MBA-I || 17.7 || data-sort-value="0.86" | 860 m || multiple || 2000–2021 || 15 Jan 2021 || 67 || align=left | Disc.: Spacewatch || 
|- id="2000 CO153" bgcolor=#fefefe
| 1 ||  || MBA-I || 18.5 || data-sort-value="0.59" | 590 m || multiple || 2000–2019 || 20 Dec 2019 || 67 || align=left | Disc.: Kitt Peak || 
|- id="2000 CP153" bgcolor=#d6d6d6
| 0 ||  || MBA-O || 17.09 || 2.1 km || multiple || 2000–2022 || 25 Jan 2022 || 84 || align=left | Disc.: Kitt Peak || 
|- id="2000 CR153" bgcolor=#E9E9E9
| 0 ||  || MBA-M || 18.1 || 1.0 km || multiple || 2000–2019 || 02 Nov 2019 || 65 || align=left | Disc.: Kitt Peak || 
|- id="2000 CS153" bgcolor=#E9E9E9
| 0 ||  || MBA-M || 18.0 || data-sort-value="0.75" | 750 m || multiple || 2000–2019 || 28 Nov 2019 || 59 || align=left | Disc.: Kitt Peak || 
|- id="2000 CU153" bgcolor=#fefefe
| 0 ||  || MBA-I || 18.55 || data-sort-value="0.58" | 580 m || multiple || 2000–2021 || 09 Apr 2021 || 72 || align=left | Disc.: Spacewatch || 
|- id="2000 CV153" bgcolor=#d6d6d6
| 0 ||  || MBA-O || 17.3 || 1.9 km || multiple || 2000–2019 || 25 Oct 2019 || 60 || align=left | Disc.: Kitt Peak || 
|- id="2000 CW153" bgcolor=#d6d6d6
| 0 ||  || MBA-O || 17.2 || 2.0 km || multiple || 2000–2019 || 26 Nov 2019 || 60 || align=left | Disc.: Kitt Peak || 
|- id="2000 CX153" bgcolor=#d6d6d6
| 0 ||  || MBA-O || 16.8 || 2.4 km || multiple || 2000–2020 || 08 Dec 2020 || 78 || align=left | Disc.: Kitt Peak || 
|- id="2000 CY153" bgcolor=#fefefe
| 0 ||  || MBA-I || 18.3 || data-sort-value="0.65" | 650 m || multiple || 2000–2019 || 24 Sep 2019 || 61 || align=left | Disc.: Kitt Peak || 
|- id="2000 CZ153" bgcolor=#E9E9E9
| 0 ||  || MBA-M || 17.5 || data-sort-value="0.94" | 940 m || multiple || 2000–2021 || 15 Jan 2021 || 56 || align=left | Disc.: Spacewatch || 
|- id="2000 CA154" bgcolor=#E9E9E9
| 0 ||  || MBA-M || 17.31 || 1.5 km || multiple || 2000–2022 || 25 Jan 2022 || 56 || align=left | Disc.: Spacewatch || 
|- id="2000 CB154" bgcolor=#d6d6d6
| 0 ||  || MBA-O || 16.66 || 2.6 km || multiple || 2000–2022 || 25 Jan 2022 || 58 || align=left | Disc.: Kitt Peak || 
|- id="2000 CC154" bgcolor=#E9E9E9
| 0 ||  || MBA-M || 16.9 || 1.8 km || multiple || 2000–2021 || 06 Jan 2021 || 69 || align=left | Disc.: Spacewatch || 
|- id="2000 CD154" bgcolor=#fefefe
| 0 ||  || MBA-I || 19.4 || data-sort-value="0.39" | 390 m || multiple || 1995–2019 || 28 Oct 2019 || 62 || align=left | Disc.: SpacewatchAlt.: 1995 UJ15 || 
|- id="2000 CF154" bgcolor=#fefefe
| 0 ||  || MBA-I || 18.4 || data-sort-value="0.62" | 620 m || multiple || 2000–2020 || 09 Dec 2020 || 125 || align=left | Disc.: Kitt PeakAlt.: 2011 GB99 || 
|- id="2000 CG154" bgcolor=#fefefe
| 0 ||  || MBA-I || 18.3 || data-sort-value="0.65" | 650 m || multiple || 2000–2021 || 11 Jun 2021 || 77 || align=left | Disc.: SDSS || 
|- id="2000 CH154" bgcolor=#E9E9E9
| 1 ||  || MBA-M || 18.4 || data-sort-value="0.62" | 620 m || multiple || 2000–2019 || 25 Nov 2019 || 56 || align=left | Disc.: Kitt Peak || 
|- id="2000 CJ154" bgcolor=#E9E9E9
| 0 ||  || MBA-M || 17.61 || data-sort-value="0.89" | 890 m || multiple || 2000–2021 || 15 May 2021 || 103 || align=left | Disc.: Kitt Peak || 
|- id="2000 CK154" bgcolor=#d6d6d6
| 1 ||  || MBA-O || 17.2 || 2.0 km || multiple || 2000–2019 || 15 Nov 2019 || 42 || align=left | Disc.: Spacewatch || 
|- id="2000 CL154" bgcolor=#fefefe
| 0 ||  || MBA-I || 18.7 || data-sort-value="0.54" | 540 m || multiple || 2000–2019 || 26 Oct 2019 || 54 || align=left | Disc.: Kitt Peak || 
|- id="2000 CM154" bgcolor=#d6d6d6
| 0 ||  || MBA-O || 17.2 || 2.0 km || multiple || 2000–2019 || 19 Nov 2019 || 41 || align=left | Disc.: Kitt Peak || 
|- id="2000 CN154" bgcolor=#fefefe
| 0 ||  || MBA-I || 18.4 || data-sort-value="0.62" | 620 m || multiple || 2000–2021 || 18 Jan 2021 || 52 || align=left | Disc.: Kitt Peak || 
|- id="2000 CO154" bgcolor=#fefefe
| 0 ||  || MBA-I || 17.55 || data-sort-value="0.92" | 920 m || multiple || 2000–2021 || 12 Jun 2021 || 74 || align=left | Disc.: Kitt Peak || 
|- id="2000 CP154" bgcolor=#fefefe
| 0 ||  || MBA-I || 18.2 || data-sort-value="0.68" | 680 m || multiple || 2000–2019 || 03 Oct 2019 || 43 || align=left | Disc.: Kitt Peak || 
|- id="2000 CQ154" bgcolor=#d6d6d6
| 0 ||  || MBA-O || 17.2 || 2.0 km || multiple || 2000–2020 || 22 Jan 2020 || 74 || align=left | Disc.: Kitt Peak || 
|- id="2000 CR154" bgcolor=#E9E9E9
| 0 ||  || MBA-M || 17.94 || data-sort-value="0.77" | 770 m || multiple || 1996–2021 || 03 May 2021 || 77 || align=left | Disc.: SDSS || 
|- id="2000 CS154" bgcolor=#E9E9E9
| 0 ||  || MBA-M || 17.7 || 1.2 km || multiple || 2000–2019 || 03 Oct 2019 || 38 || align=left | Disc.: Kitt Peak || 
|- id="2000 CT154" bgcolor=#fefefe
| 0 ||  || MBA-I || 18.80 || data-sort-value="0.52" | 520 m || multiple || 2000–2022 || 24 Jan 2022 || 50 || align=left | Disc.: Spacewatch || 
|- id="2000 CU154" bgcolor=#d6d6d6
| 0 ||  || MBA-O || 17.1 || 2.1 km || multiple || 2000–2020 || 15 Apr 2020 || 52 || align=left | Disc.: Kitt Peak || 
|- id="2000 CV154" bgcolor=#E9E9E9
| 0 ||  || MBA-M || 17.5 || 1.8 km || multiple || 2000–2019 || 25 Jan 2019 || 38 || align=left | Disc.: Kitt Peak || 
|- id="2000 CW154" bgcolor=#d6d6d6
| 0 ||  || MBA-O || 17.12 || 2.1 km || multiple || 2000–2022 || 27 Jan 2022 || 41 || align=left | Disc.: Spacewatch || 
|- id="2000 CX154" bgcolor=#E9E9E9
| 1 ||  || MBA-M || 18.0 || 1.1 km || multiple || 2000–2017 || 05 Feb 2017 || 35 || align=left | Disc.: Kitt Peak || 
|- id="2000 CY154" bgcolor=#E9E9E9
| 1 ||  || MBA-M || 17.5 || 1.8 km || multiple || 2000–2018 || 24 Jan 2018 || 48 || align=left | Disc.: SpacewatchAlt.: 2010 HL113 || 
|- id="2000 CZ154" bgcolor=#d6d6d6
| 0 ||  || MBA-O || 17.3 || 1.9 km || multiple || 2000–2019 || 02 Dec 2019 || 31 || align=left | Disc.: Kitt Peak || 
|- id="2000 CA155" bgcolor=#fefefe
| 0 ||  || MBA-I || 18.30 || data-sort-value="0.65" | 650 m || multiple || 2000–2019 || 27 Sep 2019 || 38 || align=left | Disc.: Spacewatch || 
|- id="2000 CB155" bgcolor=#fefefe
| 0 ||  || MBA-I || 18.6 || data-sort-value="0.57" | 570 m || multiple || 2000–2020 || 17 Sep 2020 || 34 || align=left | Disc.: SDSS || 
|- id="2000 CC155" bgcolor=#fefefe
| 0 ||  || MBA-I || 19.28 || data-sort-value="0.41" | 410 m || multiple || 2000–2021 || 02 Oct 2021 || 75 || align=left | Disc.: Spacewatch || 
|- id="2000 CD155" bgcolor=#d6d6d6
| 0 ||  || MBA-O || 16.81 || 2.4 km || multiple || 2000–2022 || 26 Jan 2022 || 40 || align=left | Disc.: SDSS || 
|- id="2000 CE155" bgcolor=#fefefe
| 0 ||  || MBA-I || 18.6 || data-sort-value="0.57" | 570 m || multiple || 2000–2019 || 02 Jun 2019 || 29 || align=left | Disc.: Kitt Peak || 
|- id="2000 CF155" bgcolor=#E9E9E9
| 1 ||  || MBA-M || 17.8 || data-sort-value="0.82" | 820 m || multiple || 2000–2020 || 30 Jan 2020 || 48 || align=left | Disc.: Kitt Peak || 
|- id="2000 CG155" bgcolor=#fefefe
| 0 ||  || MBA-I || 18.08 || data-sort-value="0.72" | 720 m || multiple || 2000–2021 || 27 Nov 2021 || 115 || align=left | Disc.: Spacewatch || 
|- id="2000 CH155" bgcolor=#d6d6d6
| 0 ||  || MBA-O || 18.00 || 1.4 km || multiple || 1998–2020 || 24 Dec 2020 || 183 || align=left | Disc.: Kitt Peak || 
|- id="2000 CK155" bgcolor=#E9E9E9
| 0 ||  || MBA-M || 17.1 || 1.6 km || multiple || 2000–2020 || 11 Dec 2020 || 93 || align=left | Disc.: Spacewatch || 
|- id="2000 CO155" bgcolor=#E9E9E9
| 0 ||  || MBA-M || 17.45 || 1.8 km || multiple || 2000–2021 || 09 Dec 2021 || 92 || align=left | Disc.: Spacewatch || 
|- id="2000 CQ155" bgcolor=#E9E9E9
| 0 ||  || MBA-M || 17.76 || data-sort-value="0.83" | 830 m || multiple || 2000–2021 || 03 May 2021 || 86 || align=left | Disc.: Spacewatch || 
|- id="2000 CR155" bgcolor=#E9E9E9
| 0 ||  || MBA-M || 17.0 || 2.2 km || multiple || 2000–2021 || 09 Jan 2021 || 50 || align=left | Disc.: La Silla Obs. || 
|- id="2000 CS155" bgcolor=#E9E9E9
| 0 ||  || MBA-M || 17.8 || 1.2 km || multiple || 2000–2019 || 29 Jul 2019 || 39 || align=left | Disc.: Kitt Peak || 
|- id="2000 CT155" bgcolor=#fefefe
| 0 ||  || MBA-I || 18.5 || data-sort-value="0.59" | 590 m || multiple || 2000–2021 || 16 Jan 2021 || 46 || align=left | Disc.: Kitt Peak || 
|- id="2000 CU155" bgcolor=#E9E9E9
| 0 ||  || MBA-M || 17.3 || 1.9 km || multiple || 2000–2020 || 11 Sep 2020 || 68 || align=left | Disc.: Spacewatch || 
|- id="2000 CV155" bgcolor=#d6d6d6
| 0 ||  || MBA-O || 16.85 || 2.4 km || multiple || 2000–2022 || 27 Jan 2022 || 70 || align=left | Disc.: Spacewatch || 
|- id="2000 CW155" bgcolor=#d6d6d6
| 0 ||  || MBA-O || 17.2 || 2.0 km || multiple || 2000–2019 || 23 Sep 2019 || 44 || align=left | Disc.: Kitt Peak || 
|- id="2000 CX155" bgcolor=#fefefe
| 0 ||  || MBA-I || 18.6 || data-sort-value="0.57" | 570 m || multiple || 2000–2020 || 11 Dec 2020 || 49 || align=left | Disc.: Kitt Peak || 
|- id="2000 CY155" bgcolor=#E9E9E9
| 1 ||  || MBA-M || 17.4 || 1.4 km || multiple || 2000–2020 || 20 Nov 2020 || 40 || align=left | Disc.: SDSS || 
|- id="2000 CZ155" bgcolor=#E9E9E9
| 0 ||  || MBA-M || 17.5 || 1.3 km || multiple || 2000–2020 || 10 Dec 2020 || 44 || align=left | Disc.: Kitt Peak || 
|- id="2000 CA156" bgcolor=#fefefe
| 0 ||  || MBA-I || 18.2 || data-sort-value="0.68" | 680 m || multiple || 2000–2020 || 17 Nov 2020 || 56 || align=left | Disc.: Kitt Peak || 
|- id="2000 CB156" bgcolor=#d6d6d6
| 0 ||  || MBA-O || 17.2 || 2.0 km || multiple || 2000–2019 || 27 Jan 2019 || 39 || align=left | Disc.: Spacewatch || 
|- id="2000 CC156" bgcolor=#fefefe
| 0 ||  || MBA-I || 18.45 || data-sort-value="0.61" | 610 m || multiple || 2000–2021 || 28 Oct 2021 || 83 || align=left | Disc.: Kitt Peak || 
|- id="2000 CD156" bgcolor=#d6d6d6
| 0 ||  || MBA-O || 17.3 || 1.9 km || multiple || 2000–2019 || 25 Sep 2019 || 29 || align=left | Disc.: Kitt Peak || 
|- id="2000 CE156" bgcolor=#d6d6d6
| 0 ||  || MBA-O || 17.3 || 1.9 km || multiple || 2000–2019 || 29 Jul 2019 || 27 || align=left | Disc.: Kitt Peak || 
|- id="2000 CF156" bgcolor=#fefefe
| 0 ||  || MBA-I || 19.06 || data-sort-value="0.46" | 460 m || multiple || 2000–2021 || 04 May 2021 || 59 || align=left | Disc.: SDSS || 
|- id="2000 CG156" bgcolor=#E9E9E9
| 0 ||  || MBA-M || 18.1 || 1.3 km || multiple || 2000–2020 || 15 Sep 2020 || 46 || align=left | Disc.: Kitt Peak || 
|- id="2000 CH156" bgcolor=#fefefe
| 0 ||  || MBA-I || 18.50 || data-sort-value="0.59" | 590 m || multiple || 1998–2021 || 14 May 2021 || 35 || align=left | Disc.: Kitt Peak || 
|- id="2000 CL156" bgcolor=#E9E9E9
| 0 ||  || MBA-M || 17.7 || 1.2 km || multiple || 2000–2019 || 04 Dec 2019 || 66 || align=left | Disc.: Kitt Peak || 
|- id="2000 CM156" bgcolor=#E9E9E9
| 0 ||  || MBA-M || 17.3 || 1.5 km || multiple || 2000–2019 || 24 Sep 2019 || 67 || align=left | Disc.: Spacewatch || 
|- id="2000 CO156" bgcolor=#E9E9E9
| 0 ||  || MBA-M || 17.4 || 1.4 km || multiple || 2000–2021 || 06 Jan 2021 || 49 || align=left | Disc.: SDSS || 
|- id="2000 CP156" bgcolor=#fefefe
| 1 ||  || MBA-I || 18.4 || data-sort-value="0.62" | 620 m || multiple || 2000–2019 || 25 Sep 2019 || 39 || align=left | Disc.: Kitt Peak || 
|- id="2000 CQ156" bgcolor=#E9E9E9
| 0 ||  || MBA-M || 18.05 || 1.0 km || multiple || 2000–2021 || 16 Jan 2021 || 41 || align=left | Disc.: Kitt Peak || 
|- id="2000 CR156" bgcolor=#fefefe
| 0 ||  || MBA-I || 18.9 || data-sort-value="0.49" | 490 m || multiple || 2000–2020 || 23 Oct 2020 || 36 || align=left | Disc.: Kitt Peak || 
|- id="2000 CS156" bgcolor=#E9E9E9
| 0 ||  || MBA-M || 17.7 || data-sort-value="0.86" | 860 m || multiple || 1998–2019 || 28 Dec 2019 || 62 || align=left | Disc.: Spacewatch || 
|- id="2000 CT156" bgcolor=#E9E9E9
| 0 ||  || MBA-M || 17.44 || 1.8 km || multiple || 2000–2021 || 30 Nov 2021 || 100 || align=left | Disc.: Spacewatch || 
|- id="2000 CU156" bgcolor=#d6d6d6
| 0 ||  || MBA-O || 16.9 || 2.3 km || multiple || 2000–2021 || 18 Jan 2021 || 48 || align=left | Disc.: Kitt Peak || 
|- id="2000 CV156" bgcolor=#E9E9E9
| 3 ||  || MBA-M || 18.3 || data-sort-value="0.65" | 650 m || multiple || 2000–2019 || 25 Oct 2019 || 43 || align=left | Disc.: Kitt Peak || 
|- id="2000 CW156" bgcolor=#fefefe
| 0 ||  || MBA-I || 18.61 || data-sort-value="0.56" | 560 m || multiple || 2000–2021 || 13 May 2021 || 81 || align=left | Disc.: Spacewatch || 
|- id="2000 CX156" bgcolor=#d6d6d6
| 0 ||  || MBA-O || 16.77 || 2.5 km || multiple || 2000–2022 || 07 Jan 2022 || 40 || align=left | Disc.: Kitt Peak || 
|- id="2000 CY156" bgcolor=#d6d6d6
| 0 ||  || MBA-O || 17.1 || 2.1 km || multiple || 2000–2021 || 15 Jan 2021 || 40 || align=left | Disc.: Spacewatch || 
|- id="2000 CA157" bgcolor=#E9E9E9
| 0 ||  || MBA-M || 18.16 || data-sort-value="0.69" | 690 m || multiple || 2000–2021 || 16 Apr 2021 || 36 || align=left | Disc.: Spacewatch || 
|- id="2000 CB157" bgcolor=#d6d6d6
| 0 ||  || MBA-O || 17.1 || 2.1 km || multiple || 2000–2019 || 25 Jul 2019 || 27 || align=left | Disc.: Spacewatch || 
|- id="2000 CC157" bgcolor=#E9E9E9
| 1 ||  || MBA-M || 18.30 || data-sort-value="0.65" | 650 m || multiple || 2000–2021 || 16 Apr 2021 || 25 || align=left | Disc.: Kitt Peak || 
|- id="2000 CD157" bgcolor=#E9E9E9
| 0 ||  || MBA-M || 18.02 || 1.4 km || multiple || 2000–2021 || 08 Sep 2021 || 43 || align=left | Disc.: Kitt Peak || 
|- id="2000 CE157" bgcolor=#d6d6d6
| 1 ||  || MBA-O || 16.88 || 2.3 km || multiple || 2000–2022 || 25 Jan 2022 || 41 || align=left | Disc.: Kitt Peak || 
|- id="2000 CG157" bgcolor=#d6d6d6
| 0 ||  || MBA-O || 17.12 || 2.1 km || multiple || 2000–2022 || 27 Jan 2022 || 47 || align=left | Disc.: SDSSAdded on 21 August 2021 || 
|- id="2000 CK157" bgcolor=#d6d6d6
| 0 ||  || MBA-O || 16.05 || 3.4 km || multiple || 2000–2020 || 09 Oct 2020 || 36 || align=left | Disc.: SpacewatchAdded on 24 December 2021 || 
|}
back to top

D 

|- id="2000 DN1" bgcolor=#FFC2E0
| 1 ||  || APO || 19.9 || data-sort-value="0.37" | 370 m || multiple || 2000–2018 || 12 Nov 2018 || 77 || align=left | Disc.: LINEARPotentially hazardous object || 
|- id="2000 DS2" bgcolor=#E9E9E9
| 0 ||  || MBA-M || 16.6 || 2.0 km || multiple || 2000–2021 || 04 Jan 2021 || 151 || align=left | Disc.: SpacewatchAlt.: 2013 ED3 || 
|- id="2000 DF8" bgcolor=#FA8072
| 0 ||  || MCA || 18.18 || data-sort-value="0.69" | 690 m || multiple || 2000–2021 || 13 May 2021 || 146 || align=left | Disc.: CSS || 
|- id="2000 DG8" bgcolor=#C7FF8F
| 2 ||  || CEN || 13.1 || 16 km || multiple || 2000–2001 || 01 Feb 2001 || 124 || align=left | Disc.: LINEAR, albedo: 0.053 || 
|- id="2000 DL8" bgcolor=#FFC2E0
| 1 ||  || APO || 19.11 || data-sort-value="0.56" | 560 m || multiple || 2000–2023 || 17 Mar 2023 || 86 || align=left | Disc.: LINEAR || 
|- id="2000 DO8" bgcolor=#FFC2E0
| 6 ||  || APO || 24.8 || data-sort-value="0.039" | 39 m || single || 5 days || 04 Mar 2000 || 55 || align=left | Disc.: LINEAR || 
|- id="2000 DQ10" bgcolor=#fefefe
| 0 ||  || MBA-I || 18.45 || data-sort-value="0.68" | 680 m || multiple || 2000–2023 || 13 Mar 2023 || 75 || align=left | Disc.: Spacewatch || 
|- id="2000 DQ17" bgcolor=#fefefe
| 1 ||  || MBA-I || 17.4 || data-sort-value="0.98" | 980 m || multiple || 2000–2020 || 01 Jan 2020 || 115 || align=left | Disc.: LINEAR || 
|- id="2000 DJ39" bgcolor=#d6d6d6
| 0 ||  || MBA-O || 16.41 || 2.9 km || multiple || 2000–2021 || 07 Apr 2021 || 169 || align=left | Disc.: LINEARAlt.: 2010 FF68, 2016 BM8 || 
|- id="2000 DD50" bgcolor=#E9E9E9
| 0 ||  || MBA-M || 16.59 || 2.7 km || multiple || 2000–2022 || 07 Jan 2022 || 245 || align=left | Disc.: LINEARAlt.: 2007 VZ241, 2009 DB159, 2010 EA187, 2011 SV107 || 
|- id="2000 DH52" bgcolor=#E9E9E9
| 0 ||  || MBA-M || 17.4 || 1.4 km || multiple || 2000–2021 || 05 Jan 2021 || 116 || align=left | Disc.: LINEAR || 
|- id="2000 DG58" bgcolor=#d6d6d6
| 0 ||  || MBA-O || 17.0 || 2.2 km || multiple || 2000–2021 || 08 Jan 2021 || 48 || align=left | Disc.: LINEARAdded on 17 January 2021 || 
|- id="2000 DF79" bgcolor=#fefefe
| 0 ||  || MBA-I || 17.54 || data-sort-value="0.92" | 920 m || multiple || 2000–2021 || 01 Apr 2021 || 109 || align=left | Disc.: LINEAR || 
|- id="2000 DW88" bgcolor=#E9E9E9
| 0 ||  || MBA-M || 17.71 || data-sort-value="0.85" | 850 m || multiple || 2000–2021 || 15 May 2021 || 43 || align=left | Disc.: SpacewatchAdded on 11 May 2021Alt.: 2021 GE42 || 
|- id="2000 DL90" bgcolor=#E9E9E9
| 0 ||  || MBA-M || 17.36 || 1.0 km || multiple || 2000–2021 || 08 Apr 2021 || 135 || align=left | Disc.: Spacewatch || 
|- id="2000 DT90" bgcolor=#E9E9E9
| 1 ||  || MBA-M || 18.45 || data-sort-value="0.88" | 860 m || multiple || 2000–2022 || 25 Mar 2022 || 53 || align=left | Disc.: SpacewatchAlt.: 2013 AL111 || 
|- id="2000 DG91" bgcolor=#d6d6d6
| 0 ||  || MBA-O || 17.19 || 2.0 km || multiple || 2000–2022 || 27 Jan 2022 || 49 || align=left | Disc.: Spacewatch || 
|- id="2000 DO91" bgcolor=#fefefe
| 0 ||  || MBA-I || 18.2 || data-sort-value="0.68" | 680 m || multiple || 2000–2019 || 26 Sep 2019 || 51 || align=left | Disc.: SpacewatchAlt.: 2007 CA69, 2011 FC122, 2012 TU104 || 
|- id="2000 DW91" bgcolor=#fefefe
| 1 ||  || MBA-I || 18.8 || data-sort-value="0.52" | 520 m || multiple || 2000–2020 || 20 Oct 2020 || 32 || align=left | Disc.: SpacewatchAdded on 19 October 2020 || 
|- id="2000 DV110" bgcolor=#FFC2E0
| 1 ||  || AMO || 19.23 || data-sort-value="0.51" | 510 m || multiple || 1982–2021 || 07 Jan 2021 || 58 || align=left | Disc.: LINEAR || 
|- id="2000 DH113" bgcolor=#fefefe
| 1 ||  || MBA-I || 18.8 || data-sort-value="0.52" | 520 m || multiple || 2000–2018 || 18 Mar 2018 || 31 || align=left | Disc.: SpacewatchAdded on 22 July 2020Alt.: 2000 ES201 || 
|- id="2000 DM115" bgcolor=#d6d6d6
| 0 ||  || MBA-O || 16.7 || 2.5 km || multiple || 2000–2019 || 04 Nov 2019 || 61 || align=left | Disc.: Spacewatch || 
|- id="2000 DL118" bgcolor=#d6d6d6
| 0 ||  || MBA-O || 17.0 || 2.2 km || multiple || 2000–2021 || 06 Jan 2021 || 58 || align=left | Disc.: SpacewatchAlt.: 2016 BS70 || 
|- id="2000 DM118" bgcolor=#fefefe
| 0 ||  || MBA-I || 18.9 || data-sort-value="0.49" | 490 m || multiple || 2000–2019 || 31 Dec 2019 || 41 || align=left | Disc.: Spacewatch || 
|- id="2000 DN118" bgcolor=#fefefe
| 1 ||  || MBA-I || 18.8 || data-sort-value="0.52" | 520 m || multiple || 2000–2019 || 21 May 2019 || 50 || align=left | Disc.: Spacewatch || 
|- id="2000 DO118" bgcolor=#fefefe
| 0 ||  || MBA-I || 18.19 || data-sort-value="0.68" | 680 m || multiple || 2000–2021 || 07 Oct 2021 || 64 || align=left | Disc.: Spacewatch || 
|- id="2000 DP118" bgcolor=#d6d6d6
| 0 ||  || MBA-O || 16.8 || 2.4 km || multiple || 1995–2020 || 14 Dec 2020 || 61 || align=left | Disc.: Spacewatch || 
|}
back to top

E 

|- id="2000 EU2" bgcolor=#E9E9E9
| 0 ||  || MBA-M || 17.39 || 1.4 km || multiple || 2000–2021 || 08 Apr 2021 || 141 || align=left | Disc.: LINEARAlt.: 2017 BB61 || 
|- id="2000 ED7" bgcolor=#d6d6d6
| 0 ||  || MBA-O || 16.1 || 3.4 km || multiple || 1997–2019 || 24 Dec 2019 || 140 || align=left | Disc.: SpacewatchAlt.: 2011 DS41, 2013 NS16, 2013 PO44, 2014 WS215 || 
|- id="2000 EL7" bgcolor=#fefefe
| 0 ||  || MBA-I || 18.2 || data-sort-value="0.68" | 680 m || multiple || 2000–2020 || 22 Sep 2020 || 69 || align=left | Disc.: SpacewatchAlt.: 2015 EE55 || 
|- id="2000 EQ8" bgcolor=#E9E9E9
| 1 ||  || MBA-M || 17.5 || 1.3 km || multiple || 2000–2020 || 15 Dec 2020 || 42 || align=left | Disc.: LINEARAlt.: 2013 CP239 || 
|- id="2000 EA9" bgcolor=#E9E9E9
| 0 ||  || MBA-M || 17.38 || data-sort-value="0.99" | 990 m || multiple || 2000–2021 || 09 May 2021 || 122 || align=left | Disc.: LINEARAlt.: 2004 CA66 || 
|- id="2000 EY13" bgcolor=#FA8072
| – ||  || MCA || 19.9 || data-sort-value="0.44" | 440 m || single || 4 days || 07 Mar 2000 || 20 || align=left | Disc.: LINEAR || 
|- id="2000 EB14" bgcolor=#FFC2E0
| 5 ||  || ATE || 23.1 || data-sort-value="0.085" | 85 m || multiple || 2000–2011 || 03 Mar 2011 || 59 || align=left | Disc.: LINEAR || 
|- id="2000 ES15" bgcolor=#E9E9E9
| 0 ||  || MBA-M || 17.2 || 1.1 km || multiple || 2000–2021 || 14 Jun 2021 || 95 || align=left | Disc.: SpacewatchAlt.: 2017 FK143 || 
|- id="2000 ED22" bgcolor=#E9E9E9
| 0 ||  || MBA-M || 18.15 || data-sort-value="0.70" | 700 m || multiple || 1996–2021 || 13 May 2021 || 86 || align=left | Disc.: SpacewatchAlt.: 2007 XL48, 2011 WK95 || 
|- id="2000 EZ22" bgcolor=#fefefe
| 0 ||  || MBA-I || 18.4 || data-sort-value="0.62" | 620 m || multiple || 2000–2020 || 23 Jul 2020 || 69 || align=left | Disc.: SpacewatchAlt.: 2013 EO7 || 
|- id="2000 EE23" bgcolor=#d6d6d6
| 0 ||  || MBA-O || 17.21 || 2.0 km || multiple || 2000–2021 || 11 May 2021 || 53 || align=left | Disc.: SpacewatchAlt.: 2011 HE109 || 
|- id="2000 EQ23" bgcolor=#fefefe
| E ||  || MBA-I || 20.0 || data-sort-value="0.30" | 300 m || single || 4 days || 12 Mar 2000 || 9 || align=left | Disc.: Spacewatch || 
|- id="2000 ED24" bgcolor=#d6d6d6
| 0 ||  || MBA-O || 16.5 || 2.8 km || multiple || 2000–2021 || 13 Jan 2021 || 183 || align=left | Disc.: SpacewatchAlt.: 2003 SM412, 2010 DR23, 2014 RN42 || 
|- id="2000 EP24" bgcolor=#d6d6d6
| 0 ||  || MBA-O || 16.0 || 3.5 km || multiple || 2000–2021 || 15 Jan 2021 || 141 || align=left | Disc.: SpacewatchAlt.: 2010 EF62, 2016 CZ224 || 
|- id="2000 EM26" bgcolor=#FFC2E0
| 3 ||  || ATE || 22.5 || data-sort-value="0.11" | 110 m || multiple || 2000–2020 || 27 Apr 2020 || 97 || align=left | Disc.: LINEAR || 
|- id="2000 ED51" bgcolor=#E9E9E9
| 0 ||  || MBA-M || 17.5 || 1.3 km || multiple || 2000–2021 || 18 Jan 2021 || 90 || align=left | Disc.: Spacewatch || 
|- id="2000 ET51" bgcolor=#E9E9E9
| 0 ||  || MBA-M || 17.53 || 1.7 km || multiple || 2000–2021 || 30 Nov 2021 || 73 || align=left | Disc.: SpacewatchAdded on 17 June 2021Alt.: 2014 FS9 || 
|- id="2000 EG52" bgcolor=#E9E9E9
| 0 ||  || MBA-M || 17.8 || data-sort-value="0.82" | 820 m || multiple || 2000–2021 || 15 Apr 2021 || 50 || align=left | Disc.: SpacewatchAdded on 21 August 2021Alt.: 2019 SF144 || 
|- id="2000 EV52" bgcolor=#E9E9E9
| 1 ||  || MBA-M || 16.9 || 1.8 km || multiple || 2000–2021 || 04 Jan 2021 || 129 || align=left | Disc.: SpacewatchAlt.: 2010 KF55 || 
|- id="2000 EH53" bgcolor=#E9E9E9
| 0 ||  || MBA-M || 17.8 || data-sort-value="0.82" | 820 m || multiple || 1996–2018 || 17 Aug 2018 || 69 || align=left | Disc.: SpacewatchAlt.: 2014 SQ2, 2015 XN274 || 
|- id="2000 EV53" bgcolor=#FA8072
| 0 ||  || MCA || 18.8 || data-sort-value="0.52" | 520 m || multiple || 2000–2020 || 09 Sep 2020 || 94 || align=left | Disc.: SpacewatchAlt.: 2010 FU28 || 
|- id="2000 EO54" bgcolor=#fefefe
| 0 ||  || MBA-I || 18.75 || data-sort-value="0.53" | 530 m || multiple || 2000–2021 || 05 Aug 2021 || 80 || align=left | Disc.: SpacewatchAlt.: 2000 EZ139 || 
|- id="2000 EU70" bgcolor=#FFC2E0
| 1 ||  || APO || 18.9 || data-sort-value="0.59" | 590 m || multiple || 2000–2019 || 18 Aug 2019 || 94 || align=left | Disc.: LINEARPotentially hazardous object || 
|- id="2000 EK71" bgcolor=#fefefe
| 0 ||  || MBA-I || 17.87 || data-sort-value="0.79" | 790 m || multiple || 2000–2021 || 27 Sep 2021 || 63 || align=left | Disc.: Spacewatch || 
|- id="2000 EQ71" bgcolor=#d6d6d6
| 0 ||  || MBA-O || 16.5 || 2.8 km || multiple || 2000–2021 || 09 Jan 2021 || 76 || align=left | Disc.: Spacewatch || 
|- id="2000 EU73" bgcolor=#d6d6d6
| 1 ||  || MBA-O || 17.2 || 2.0 km || multiple || 2000–2021 || 10 May 2021 || 38 || align=left | Disc.: SpacewatchAdded on 17 June 2021Alt.: 2021 GA47 || 
|- id="2000 EV73" bgcolor=#fefefe
| 0 ||  || MBA-I || 18.4 || data-sort-value="0.62" | 620 m || multiple || 2000–2020 || 19 Oct 2020 || 57 || align=left | Disc.: Spacewatch || 
|- id="2000 EW73" bgcolor=#E9E9E9
| 0 ||  || MBA-M || 18.39 || data-sort-value="0.62" | 620 m || multiple || 2000–2021 || 30 May 2021 || 40 || align=left | Disc.: SpacewatchAlt.: 2006 QL171 || 
|- id="2000 EX73" bgcolor=#fefefe
| 0 ||  || MBA-I || 18.51 || data-sort-value="0.59" | 590 m || multiple || 2000–2021 || 06 Nov 2021 || 74 || align=left | Disc.: SpacewatchAdded on 22 July 2020Alt.: 2015 DP13 || 
|- id="2000 ET74" bgcolor=#E9E9E9
| 0 ||  || MBA-M || 16.90 || 1.8 km || multiple || 2000–2021 || 13 May 2021 || 143 || align=left | Disc.: SpacewatchAlt.: 2008 DW51 || 
|- id="2000 EU98" bgcolor=#fefefe
| 0 ||  || MBA-I || 18.8 || data-sort-value="0.52" | 520 m || multiple || 2000–2019 || 17 Dec 2019 || 65 || align=left | Disc.: SpacewatchAlt.: 2010 BN1, 2010 CE23 || 
|- id="2000 EX98" bgcolor=#E9E9E9
| 0 ||  || MBA-M || 17.2 || 1.1 km || multiple || 2000–2021 || 11 Jun 2021 || 157 || align=left | Disc.: LINEARAlt.: 2000 EK162 || 
|- id="2000 EG99" bgcolor=#E9E9E9
| 0 ||  || MBA-M || 17.90 || 1.5 km || multiple || 2000–2022 || 24 Jan 2022 || 52 || align=left | Disc.: Spacewatch || 
|- id="2000 EJ99" bgcolor=#d6d6d6
| 0 ||  || MBA-O || 16.8 || 2.4 km || multiple || 2000–2021 || 18 Jan 2021 || 134 || align=left | Disc.: SpacewatchAlt.: 2011 FS115 || 
|- id="2000 EM99" bgcolor=#E9E9E9
| 0 ||  || MBA-M || 17.37 || 1.4 km || multiple || 2000–2021 || 08 Apr 2021 || 226 || align=left | Disc.: SpacewatchAlt.: 2011 QJ88, 2015 PX193, 2015 TT23 || 
|- id="2000 EN99" bgcolor=#E9E9E9
| 0 ||  || MBA-M || 17.6 || 1.3 km || multiple || 2000–2021 || 17 Jan 2021 || 57 || align=left | Disc.: Spacewatch || 
|- id="2000 EO99" bgcolor=#E9E9E9
| 2 ||  || MBA-M || 18.4 || data-sort-value="0.62" | 620 m || multiple || 2000–2019 || 02 Dec 2019 || 45 || align=left | Disc.: SpacewatchAlt.: 2004 DX63 || 
|- id="2000 EX99" bgcolor=#E9E9E9
| 0 ||  || MBA-M || 16.8 || 2.4 km || multiple || 2000–2020 || 09 Dec 2020 || 128 || align=left | Disc.: SpacewatchAlt.: 2009 FF27 || 
|- id="2000 EM102" bgcolor=#fefefe
| 0 ||  || MBA-I || 18.1 || data-sort-value="0.71" | 710 m || multiple || 2000–2020 || 14 Dec 2020 || 87 || align=left | Disc.: Spacewatch || 
|- id="2000 ER102" bgcolor=#E9E9E9
| 0 ||  || MBA-M || 17.5 || 1.3 km || multiple || 2000–2020 || 11 Dec 2020 || 84 || align=left | Disc.: SpacewatchAlt.: 2004 BB153, 2011 UB241 || 
|- id="2000 EC104" bgcolor=#FFC2E0
| 5 ||  || AMO || 21.3 || data-sort-value="0.20" | 200 m || single || 19 days || 29 Mar 2000 || 38 || align=left | Disc.: LINEAR || 
|- id="2000 EG104" bgcolor=#FA8072
| 0 ||  || MCA || 16.85 || 1.8 km || multiple || 2000–2020 || 17 Dec 2020 || 162 || align=left | Disc.: CSS || 
|- id="2000 ES106" bgcolor=#FA8072
| – ||  || MCA || 20.6 || data-sort-value="0.23" | 230 m || single || 29 days || 12 Mar 2000 || 27 || align=left | Disc.: LINEAR || 
|- id="2000 EY106" bgcolor=#FFC2E0
| 0 ||  || APO || 19.43 || data-sort-value="0.46" | 460 m || multiple || 2000–2021 || 15 Oct 2021 || 150 || align=left | Disc.: LINEAR || 
|- id="2000 EZ106" bgcolor=#FFC2E0
| 8 ||  || ATE || 20.5 || data-sort-value="0.28" | 280 m || single || 14 days || 26 Mar 2000 || 38 || align=left | Disc.: LONEOS || 
|- id="2000 EE117" bgcolor=#E9E9E9
| 0 ||  || MBA-M || 16.96 || 1.2 km || multiple || 2000–2021 || 10 May 2021 || 122 || align=left | Disc.: SpacewatchAlt.: 2014 OM232 || 
|- id="2000 ED138" bgcolor=#fefefe
| 0 ||  || MBA-I || 17.6 || data-sort-value="0.90" | 900 m || multiple || 2000–2021 || 16 Jan 2021 || 93 || align=left | Disc.: LINEAR || 
|- id="2000 EG142" bgcolor=#E9E9E9
| 0 ||  || MBA-M || 17.1 || 1.6 km || multiple || 2000–2021 || 11 Jan 2021 || 99 || align=left | Disc.: LINEARAlt.: 2013 GH128 || 
|- id="2000 EL142" bgcolor=#E9E9E9
| 0 ||  || MBA-M || 17.60 || 1.7 km || multiple || 2000–2021 || 06 Dec 2021 || 69 || align=left | Disc.: LINEAR || 
|- id="2000 ES142" bgcolor=#d6d6d6
| 0 ||  || MBA-O || 16.4 || 3.3 km || multiple || 2000–2021 || 12 Jan 2021 || 101 || align=left | Disc.: LINEARAlt.: 2010 CU10 || 
|- id="2000 ET160" bgcolor=#E9E9E9
| 0 ||  || MBA-M || 17.2 || 1.1 km || multiple || 2000–2021 || 14 Jun 2021 || 115 || align=left | Disc.: LINEAR || 
|- id="2000 EU175" bgcolor=#E9E9E9
| 0 ||  || MBA-M || 17.2 || 2.0 km || multiple || 2000–2020 || 12 Sep 2020 || 53 || align=left | Disc.: LINEAR || 
|- id="2000 EK176" bgcolor=#fefefe
| 0 ||  || MBA-I || 18.0 || data-sort-value="0.75" | 750 m || multiple || 1998–2020 || 08 Dec 2020 || 121 || align=left | Disc.: SpacewatchAlt.: 2009 UR115 || 
|- id="2000 ER176" bgcolor=#d6d6d6
| 0 ||  || MBA-O || 16.4 || 2.9 km || multiple || 2000–2021 || 21 Jan 2021 || 174 || align=left | Disc.: SpacewatchAlt.: 2008 UO107, 2010 GH1, 2012 MO1, 2013 PL9 || 
|- id="2000 EZ176" bgcolor=#E9E9E9
| 0 ||  || MBA-M || 18.04 || data-sort-value="0.73" | 730 m || multiple || 2000–2021 || 08 May 2021 || 76 || align=left | Disc.: Spacewatch || 
|- id="2000 EK177" bgcolor=#fefefe
| 2 ||  || MBA-I || 18.9 || data-sort-value="0.49" | 490 m || multiple || 2000–2019 || 02 Jun 2019 || 33 || align=left | Disc.: Spacewatch || 
|- id="2000 EP177" bgcolor=#d6d6d6
| 0 ||  || MBA-O || 16.76 || 2.5 km || multiple || 2000–2022 || 26 Jan 2022 || 55 || align=left | Disc.: SpacewatchAdded on 22 July 2020Alt.: 2008 SF222 || 
|- id="2000 EQ177" bgcolor=#d6d6d6
| 0 ||  || MBA-O || 17.0 || 2.2 km || multiple || 2000–2019 || 26 Nov 2019 || 63 || align=left | Disc.: Spacewatch || 
|- id="2000 ER177" bgcolor=#E9E9E9
| 0 ||  || MBA-M || 17.4 || 1.4 km || multiple || 2000–2021 || 15 Jan 2021 || 100 || align=left | Disc.: SpacewatchAdded on 17 January 2021Alt.: 2000 EM212, 2015 VL31 || 
|- id="2000 EZ177" bgcolor=#d6d6d6
| 0 ||  || MBA-O || 16.2 || 3.2 km || multiple || 2000–2021 || 05 Jan 2021 || 116 || align=left | Disc.: SpacewatchAlt.: 2010 CZ17, 2017 FM52 || 
|- id="2000 EJ178" bgcolor=#fefefe
| 1 ||  || MBA-I || 19.0 || data-sort-value="0.47" | 470 m || multiple || 2000–2020 || 10 Dec 2020 || 24 || align=left | Disc.: SpacewatchAdded on 22 July 2020 || 
|- id="2000 ES188" bgcolor=#d6d6d6
| 0 ||  || MBA-O || 16.5 || 2.8 km || multiple || 2000–2018 || 07 Aug 2018 || 68 || align=left | Disc.: LINEARAlt.: 2011 HD54, 2016 CV32 || 
|- id="2000 EJ189" bgcolor=#fefefe
| 0 ||  || MBA-I || 17.4 || data-sort-value="0.98" | 980 m || multiple || 2000–2020 || 14 Dec 2020 || 212 || align=left | Disc.: LINEARAlt.: 2004 JP36, 2016 UF10 || 
|- id="2000 ER189" bgcolor=#d6d6d6
| 0 ||  || MBA-O || 16.15 || 3.3 km || multiple || 2000–2022 || 07 Jan 2022 || 57 || align=left | Disc.: LINEARAdded on 22 July 2020 || 
|- id="2000 EF193" bgcolor=#fefefe
| 0 ||  || MBA-I || 17.2 || 1.1 km || multiple || 2000–2021 || 07 Jan 2021 || 197 || align=left | Disc.: LINEARAlt.: 2013 YM96, 2015 NQ21, 2018 DB3 || 
|- id="2000 EW196" bgcolor=#fefefe
| 0 ||  || MBA-I || 17.8 || data-sort-value="0.82" | 820 m || multiple || 2000–2020 || 27 Jun 2020 || 82 || align=left | Disc.: SpacewatchAlt.: 2009 SQ133, 2015 BU478 || 
|- id="2000 EH197" bgcolor=#d6d6d6
| 0 ||  = (619201) || MBA-O || 16.1 || 3.4 km || multiple || 2000–2020 || 23 Aug 2020 || 106 || align=left | Disc.: LINEARAlt.: 2005 YN220 || 
|- id="2000 EV202" bgcolor=#E9E9E9
| 0 ||  || MBA-M || 17.4 || 1.4 km || multiple || 2000–2021 || 17 Jan 2021 || 67 || align=left | Disc.: Cerro Tololo || 
|- id="2000 EA203" bgcolor=#d6d6d6
| 0 ||  || MBA-O || 16.50 || 2.8 km || multiple || 2000–2022 || 09 Jan 2022 || 105 || align=left | Disc.: Cerro TololoAlt.: 2007 MB20, 2016 AN25 || 
|- id="2000 ED203" bgcolor=#d6d6d6
| 0 ||  || MBA-O || 16.8 || 2.4 km || multiple || 2000–2020 || 12 Dec 2020 || 40 || align=left | Disc.: Cerro Tololo || 
|- id="2000 EE203" bgcolor=#d6d6d6
| 0 ||  || MBA-O || 16.9 || 2.3 km || multiple || 2000–2020 || 19 Jan 2020 || 66 || align=left | Disc.: Cerro Tololo || 
|- id="2000 EO203" bgcolor=#d6d6d6
| 6 ||  || MBA-O || 16.9 || 2.3 km || multiple || 2000–2003 || 28 Sep 2003 || 28 || align=left | Disc.: Cerro TololoAlt.: 2003 SY229 || 
|- id="2000 ER203" bgcolor=#fefefe
| 0 ||  || MBA-I || 17.7 || data-sort-value="0.86" | 860 m || multiple || 1994–2020 || 05 Dec 2020 || 120 || align=left | Disc.: Cerro TololoAlt.: 2011 HQ95, 2015 MC27 || 
|- id="2000 ET203" bgcolor=#d6d6d6
| 1 ||  || MBA-O || 17.89 || 1.5 km || multiple || 2000–2021 || 28 Sep 2021 || 31 || align=left | Disc.: Cerro TololoAdded on 11 May 2021Alt.: 2016 PY189 || 
|- id="2000 EU203" bgcolor=#fefefe
| 0 ||  || MBA-I || 18.62 || data-sort-value="0.56" | 560 m || multiple || 2000–2021 || 04 May 2021 || 62 || align=left | Disc.: Cerro TololoAlt.: 2014 HS19 || 
|- id="2000 EB204" bgcolor=#d6d6d6
| 0 ||  || MBA-O || 16.9 || 2.3 km || multiple || 2000–2020 || 14 Dec 2020 || 49 || align=left | Disc.: Cerro TololoAdded on 22 July 2020 || 
|- id="2000 EE204" bgcolor=#d6d6d6
| 0 ||  || MBA-O || 16.5 || 2.8 km || multiple || 2000–2019 || 02 Nov 2019 || 68 || align=left | Disc.: Cerro TololoAlt.: 2016 CH104, 2019 UL24 || 
|- id="2000 EK204" bgcolor=#d6d6d6
| 0 ||  || MBA-O || 16.79 || 2.4 km || multiple || 2000–2021 || 15 May 2021 || 119 || align=left | Disc.: Cerro TololoAlt.: 2015 BG442 || 
|- id="2000 EM208" bgcolor=#fefefe
| 0 ||  || MBA-I || 17.9 || data-sort-value="0.78" | 780 m || multiple || 2000–2019 || 05 Nov 2019 || 89 || align=left | Disc.: SDSSAlt.: 2007 EK183, 2011 KJ27 || 
|- id="2000 ES208" bgcolor=#E9E9E9
| 0 ||  || MBA-M || 17.84 || 1.1 km || multiple || 2000–2021 || 08 Apr 2021 || 33 || align=left | Disc.: SDSSAdded on 11 May 2021 || 
|- id="2000 EA209" bgcolor=#fefefe
| 0 ||  || MBA-I || 17.9 || data-sort-value="0.78" | 780 m || multiple || 2000–2020 || 14 Nov 2020 || 106 || align=left | Disc.: SDSS || 
|- id="2000 EB209" bgcolor=#d6d6d6
| 0 ||  || MBA-O || 17.08 || 2.1 km || multiple || 2000–2021 || 08 Sep 2021 || 135 || align=left | Disc.: Spacewatch || 
|- id="2000 EH209" bgcolor=#E9E9E9
| 0 ||  || MBA-M || 17.5 || 1.3 km || multiple || 2000–2021 || 18 Jan 2021 || 125 || align=left | Disc.: Spacewatch || 
|- id="2000 EL209" bgcolor=#E9E9E9
| 0 ||  || MBA-M || 17.12 || 2.1 km || multiple || 2000–2021 || 25 Nov 2021 || 89 || align=left | Disc.: Spacewatch || 
|- id="2000 EM209" bgcolor=#E9E9E9
| 0 ||  || MBA-M || 17.9 || data-sort-value="0.78" | 780 m || multiple || 2000–2019 || 03 Dec 2019 || 62 || align=left | Disc.: Spacewatch || 
|- id="2000 EN209" bgcolor=#E9E9E9
| 0 ||  || MBA-M || 18.0 || 1.1 km || multiple || 2000–2018 || 03 Oct 2018 || 55 || align=left | Disc.: SDSS || 
|- id="2000 EP209" bgcolor=#E9E9E9
| 0 ||  || MBA-M || 17.59 || data-sort-value="0.90" | 900 m || multiple || 2000–2021 || 14 Apr 2021 || 116 || align=left | Disc.: SDSS || 
|- id="2000 EQ209" bgcolor=#d6d6d6
| 0 ||  || MBA-O || 16.1 || 3.4 km || multiple || 2000–2021 || 14 Jan 2021 || 99 || align=left | Disc.: SDSSAlt.: 2016 AT179 || 
|- id="2000 ER209" bgcolor=#E9E9E9
| 0 ||  || MBA-M || 16.91 || 1.7 km || multiple || 2000–2022 || 26 Jan 2022 || 122 || align=left | Disc.: SDSSAlt.: 2010 HE37, 2011 WY75 || 
|- id="2000 ES209" bgcolor=#fefefe
| 0 ||  || MBA-I || 18.2 || data-sort-value="0.68" | 680 m || multiple || 2000–2019 || 27 Sep 2019 || 57 || align=left | Disc.: Spacewatch || 
|- id="2000 ET209" bgcolor=#d6d6d6
| 0 ||  || MBA-O || 16.96 || 2.3 km || multiple || 2000–2021 || 15 Feb 2021 || 87 || align=left | Disc.: SDSS || 
|- id="2000 EV209" bgcolor=#fefefe
| 0 ||  || MBA-I || 18.1 || data-sort-value="0.71" | 710 m || multiple || 2000–2020 || 15 Sep 2020 || 64 || align=left | Disc.: SDSS || 
|- id="2000 EW209" bgcolor=#d6d6d6
| 0 ||  || MBA-O || 17.44 || 1.8 km || multiple || 2000–2022 || 27 Jan 2022 || 44 || align=left | Disc.: Spacewatch || 
|- id="2000 EY209" bgcolor=#d6d6d6
| 0 ||  || MBA-O || 16.9 || 2.3 km || multiple || 2000–2017 || 30 Mar 2017 || 38 || align=left | Disc.: SDSS || 
|- id="2000 EZ209" bgcolor=#fefefe
| 0 ||  || MBA-I || 19.23 || data-sort-value="0.42" | 420 m || multiple || 2000–2021 || 08 Sep 2021 || 65 || align=left | Disc.: SDSS || 
|- id="2000 EA210" bgcolor=#E9E9E9
| 0 ||  || MBA-M || 17.12 || 1.1 km || multiple || 2000–2021 || 09 May 2021 || 104 || align=left | Disc.: SDSS || 
|- id="2000 EC210" bgcolor=#d6d6d6
| 0 ||  || MBA-O || 16.7 || 2.5 km || multiple || 2000–2021 || 12 Jan 2021 || 53 || align=left | Disc.: SDSS || 
|- id="2000 ED210" bgcolor=#fefefe
| 0 ||  || MBA-I || 17.55 || data-sort-value="0.92" | 920 m || multiple || 2000–2021 || 27 Nov 2021 || 78 || align=left | Disc.: SDSS || 
|- id="2000 EE210" bgcolor=#fefefe
| 0 ||  || HUN || 18.71 || data-sort-value="0.54" | 540 m || multiple || 2008–2021 || 06 Apr 2021 || 70 || align=left | Disc.: SDSS || 
|- id="2000 EF210" bgcolor=#fefefe
| 0 ||  || MBA-I || 18.78 || data-sort-value="0.52" | 520 m || multiple || 2000–2021 || 15 Mar 2021 || 64 || align=left | Disc.: Spacewatch || 
|- id="2000 EH210" bgcolor=#d6d6d6
| 0 ||  || MBA-O || 17.17 || 2.0 km || multiple || 2000–2022 || 08 Jan 2022 || 53 || align=left | Disc.: Cerro Tololo || 
|- id="2000 EJ210" bgcolor=#d6d6d6
| 0 ||  || MBA-O || 17.3 || 1.9 km || multiple || 2000–2017 || 25 Sep 2017 || 26 || align=left | Disc.: Spacewatch || 
|- id="2000 EK210" bgcolor=#fefefe
| 0 ||  || MBA-I || 17.70 || data-sort-value="0.86" | 860 m || multiple || 2000–2021 || 30 Nov 2021 || 98 || align=left | Disc.: SDSS || 
|- id="2000 EL210" bgcolor=#fefefe
| 0 ||  || MBA-I || 18.2 || data-sort-value="0.68" | 680 m || multiple || 2000–2020 || 07 Dec 2020 || 141 || align=left | Disc.: Anderson Mesa || 
|- id="2000 EM210" bgcolor=#E9E9E9
| 0 ||  || MBA-M || 17.9 || 1.1 km || multiple || 2000–2019 || 30 Aug 2019 || 144 || align=left | Disc.: Spacewatch || 
|- id="2000 EN210" bgcolor=#E9E9E9
| 0 ||  || MBA-M || 17.2 || 1.5 km || multiple || 2000–2021 || 24 Jan 2021 || 105 || align=left | Disc.: SDSS || 
|- id="2000 EO210" bgcolor=#d6d6d6
| 0 ||  || MBA-O || 16.9 || 2.3 km || multiple || 2000–2021 || 06 Feb 2021 || 100 || align=left | Disc.: Spacewatch || 
|- id="2000 EP210" bgcolor=#fefefe
| 0 ||  || MBA-I || 17.90 || data-sort-value="0.78" | 780 m || multiple || 2000–2021 || 20 Mar 2021 || 98 || align=left | Disc.: Spacewatch || 
|- id="2000 EQ210" bgcolor=#fefefe
| 0 ||  || MBA-I || 17.6 || data-sort-value="0.90" | 900 m || multiple || 2000–2021 || 12 Jan 2021 || 99 || align=left | Disc.: SDSS || 
|- id="2000 ER210" bgcolor=#d6d6d6
| 0 ||  || MBA-O || 16.74 || 2.5 km || multiple || 2000–2021 || 17 Apr 2021 || 95 || align=left | Disc.: SDSS || 
|- id="2000 ES210" bgcolor=#E9E9E9
| 0 ||  || MBA-M || 16.88 || 1.8 km || multiple || 1997–2022 || 10 Jan 2022 || 80 || align=left | Disc.: SDSS || 
|- id="2000 ET210" bgcolor=#d6d6d6
| 0 ||  || MBA-O || 16.9 || 2.3 km || multiple || 2000–2021 || 12 Jan 2021 || 73 || align=left | Disc.: SDSSAlt.: 2010 FV33 || 
|- id="2000 EU210" bgcolor=#d6d6d6
| 0 ||  || MBA-O || 16.6 || 2.7 km || multiple || 1997–2020 || 20 Dec 2020 || 101 || align=left | Disc.: Spacewatch || 
|- id="2000 EV210" bgcolor=#fefefe
| 0 ||  || MBA-I || 18.0 || data-sort-value="0.75" | 750 m || multiple || 2000–2021 || 15 Jan 2021 || 75 || align=left | Disc.: Spacewatch || 
|- id="2000 EW210" bgcolor=#d6d6d6
| 0 ||  || MBA-O || 16.65 || 2.6 km || multiple || 2000–2021 || 11 May 2021 || 120 || align=left | Disc.: Cerro Tololo || 
|- id="2000 EX210" bgcolor=#d6d6d6
| 0 ||  || MBA-O || 16.81 || 2.4 km || multiple || 2005–2021 || 13 May 2021 || 117 || align=left | Disc.: SDSS || 
|- id="2000 EY210" bgcolor=#d6d6d6
| 0 ||  || MBA-O || 17.0 || 2.2 km || multiple || 2000–2021 || 12 Jan 2021 || 54 || align=left | Disc.: SDSS || 
|- id="2000 EA211" bgcolor=#fefefe
| 1 ||  || HUN || 18.7 || data-sort-value="0.54" | 540 m || multiple || 2000–2019 || 02 Nov 2019 || 66 || align=left | Disc.: SDSS || 
|- id="2000 EB211" bgcolor=#fefefe
| 1 ||  || MBA-I || 18.4 || data-sort-value="0.62" | 620 m || multiple || 2000–2019 || 02 Oct 2019 || 51 || align=left | Disc.: SDSSAlt.: 2010 ET182 || 
|- id="2000 EC211" bgcolor=#E9E9E9
| 0 ||  || MBA-M || 17.81 || 1.5 km || multiple || 2000–2021 || 08 Sep 2021 || 62 || align=left | Disc.: Spacewatch || 
|- id="2000 ED211" bgcolor=#d6d6d6
| 0 ||  || MBA-O || 16.18 || 3.2 km || multiple || 2000–2022 || 24 Jan 2022 || 76 || align=left | Disc.: SDSS || 
|- id="2000 EF211" bgcolor=#d6d6d6
| 0 ||  || MBA-O || 16.6 || 2.7 km || multiple || 2000–2020 || 08 Dec 2020 || 55 || align=left | Disc.: SDSS || 
|- id="2000 EK211" bgcolor=#d6d6d6
| 0 ||  || MBA-O || 16.92 || 2.3 km || multiple || 2000–2021 || 14 Apr 2021 || 54 || align=left | Disc.: Spacewatch || 
|- id="2000 EL211" bgcolor=#E9E9E9
| 0 ||  || MBA-M || 18.13 || data-sort-value="0.70" | 700 m || multiple || 2000–2021 || 14 Apr 2021 || 69 || align=left | Disc.: SDSS || 
|- id="2000 EM211" bgcolor=#d6d6d6
| 0 ||  || MBA-O || 16.8 || 2.4 km || multiple || 2000–2019 || 06 Sep 2019 || 39 || align=left | Disc.: SDSS || 
|- id="2000 EN211" bgcolor=#fefefe
| 0 ||  || MBA-I || 18.4 || data-sort-value="0.62" | 620 m || multiple || 2000–2020 || 17 Sep 2020 || 60 || align=left | Disc.: Spacewatch || 
|- id="2000 EO211" bgcolor=#fefefe
| 0 ||  || MBA-I || 18.5 || data-sort-value="0.59" | 590 m || multiple || 2000–2020 || 11 Dec 2020 || 44 || align=left | Disc.: Spacewatch || 
|- id="2000 EP211" bgcolor=#d6d6d6
| 0 ||  || MBA-O || 16.9 || 2.3 km || multiple || 2000–2018 || 13 Sep 2018 || 35 || align=left | Disc.: SDSS || 
|- id="2000 EQ211" bgcolor=#E9E9E9
| 0 ||  || MBA-M || 17.19 || 2.0 km || multiple || 2000–2021 || 28 Nov 2021 || 82 || align=left | Disc.: SDSS || 
|- id="2000 ER211" bgcolor=#d6d6d6
| 0 ||  || MBA-O || 16.48 || 2.8 km || multiple || 2000–2022 || 26 Jan 2022 || 107 || align=left | Disc.: SDSS || 
|- id="2000 ES211" bgcolor=#E9E9E9
| 0 ||  || MBA-M || 17.0 || 1.7 km || multiple || 2000–2021 || 05 Jan 2021 || 78 || align=left | Disc.: SDSS || 
|- id="2000 EU211" bgcolor=#E9E9E9
| 0 ||  || MBA-M || 16.8 || 1.8 km || multiple || 2000–2021 || 17 Jan 2021 || 73 || align=left | Disc.: SDSS || 
|- id="2000 EV211" bgcolor=#E9E9E9
| 0 ||  || MBA-M || 17.4 || 1.4 km || multiple || 2000–2021 || 18 Jan 2021 || 62 || align=left | Disc.: SDSS || 
|- id="2000 EW211" bgcolor=#fefefe
| 0 ||  || MBA-I || 18.5 || data-sort-value="0.59" | 590 m || multiple || 2000–2019 || 27 May 2019 || 39 || align=left | Disc.: SDSS || 
|- id="2000 EX211" bgcolor=#fefefe
| 0 ||  || MBA-I || 18.1 || data-sort-value="0.71" | 710 m || multiple || 2000–2020 || 11 Dec 2020 || 45 || align=left | Disc.: SDSS || 
|- id="2000 EY211" bgcolor=#d6d6d6
| 0 ||  || MBA-O || 16.2 || 3.2 km || multiple || 2000–2021 || 26 Oct 2021 || 72 || align=left | Disc.: SpacewatchAlt.: 2010 LG15 || 
|- id="2000 EB212" bgcolor=#E9E9E9
| 0 ||  || MBA-M || 17.59 || 1.7 km || multiple || 2000–2021 || 30 Nov 2021 || 46 || align=left | Disc.: SDSS || 
|- id="2000 EC212" bgcolor=#fefefe
| 0 ||  || MBA-I || 18.3 || data-sort-value="0.65" | 650 m || multiple || 2000–2019 || 25 Jul 2019 || 24 || align=left | Disc.: SDSS || 
|- id="2000 ED212" bgcolor=#E9E9E9
| 0 ||  || MBA-M || 17.44 || data-sort-value="0.97" | 970 m || multiple || 2000–2021 || 01 May 2021 || 88 || align=left | Disc.: SDSS || 
|- id="2000 EE212" bgcolor=#d6d6d6
| 0 ||  || MBA-O || 16.76 || 2.5 km || multiple || 2000–2021 || 11 Apr 2021 || 68 || align=left | Disc.: Spacewatch || 
|- id="2000 EF212" bgcolor=#E9E9E9
| 0 ||  || MBA-M || 17.39 || 1.4 km || multiple || 2000–2021 || 14 Apr 2021 || 114 || align=left | Disc.: SDSS || 
|- id="2000 EG212" bgcolor=#d6d6d6
| 0 ||  || MBA-O || 16.8 || 2.4 km || multiple || 2000–2019 || 02 Dec 2019 || 46 || align=left | Disc.: Spacewatch || 
|- id="2000 EJ212" bgcolor=#E9E9E9
| 0 ||  || MBA-M || 17.93 || 1.4 km || multiple || 2000–2021 || 03 Oct 2021 || 31 || align=left | Disc.: SDSS || 
|- id="2000 EK212" bgcolor=#E9E9E9
| 0 ||  || MBA-M || 17.88 || 1.1 km || multiple || 2000–2022 || 27 Jan 2022 || 35 || align=left | Disc.: SDSS || 
|- id="2000 EL212" bgcolor=#d6d6d6
| 0 ||  || MBA-O || 16.9 || 2.3 km || multiple || 2000–2020 || 06 Dec 2020 || 27 || align=left | Disc.: Spacewatch || 
|- id="2000 EO212" bgcolor=#E9E9E9
| 0 ||  || MBA-M || 17.99 || data-sort-value="0.75" | 750 m || multiple || 2000–2021 || 30 Jun 2021 || 36 || align=left | Disc.: SDSSAdded on 17 June 2021 || 
|}
back to top

References 
 

Lists of unnumbered minor planets